= List of awards and nominations received by Homeland =

Homeland awards and nominations
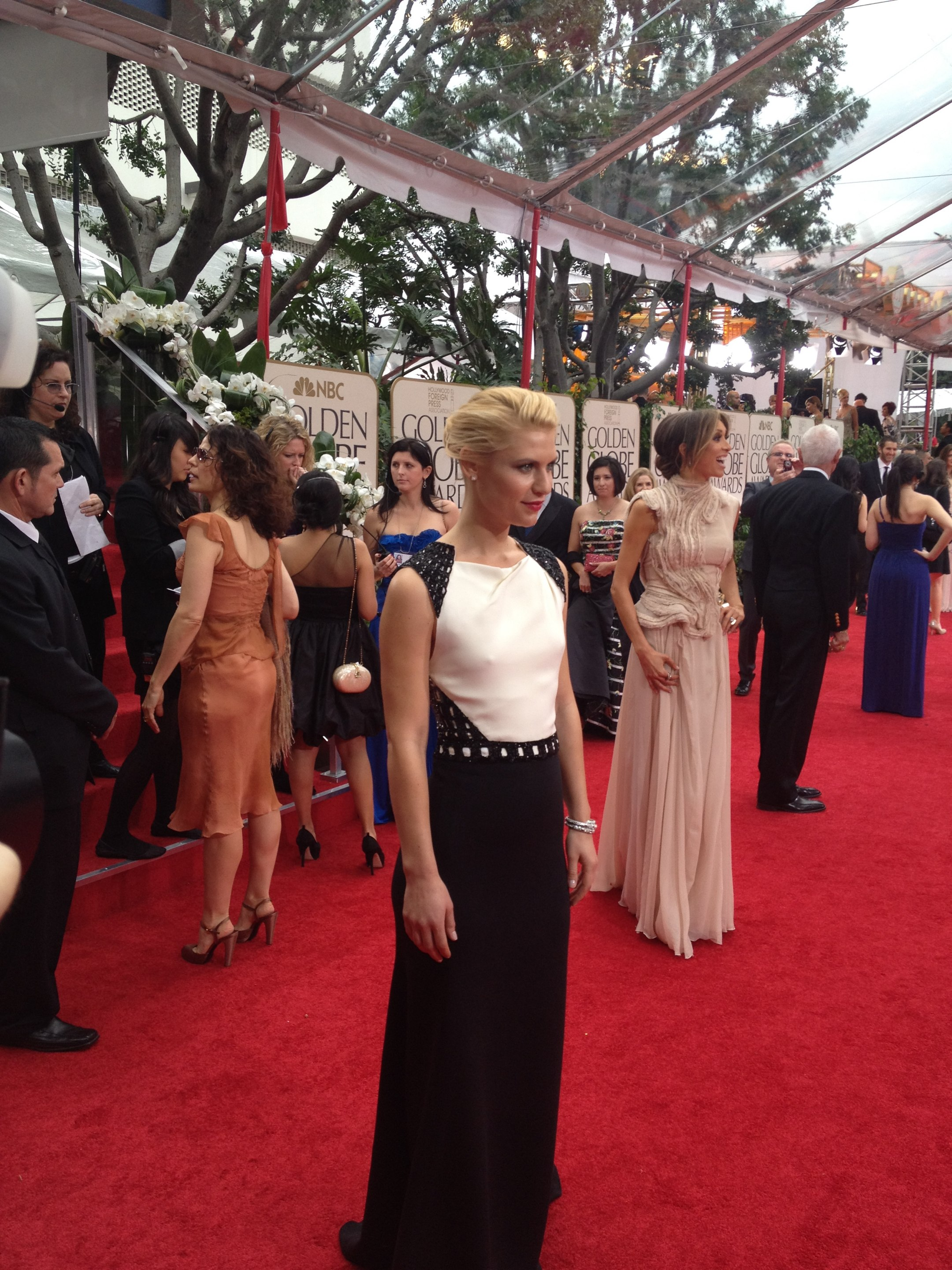
- Claire Danes has won numerous awards and critical acclaim for her portrayal of Carrie Mathison on Homeland.
Awards and nominations
Award	Wins	Nominations
American Cinema Editors Awards	1	1
American Film Institute Awards	3	3
Critics' Choice Television Awards	2	9
Directors Guild of America Awards	2	8
Edgar Awards	1	2
Golden Globe Awards	5	8
Peabody Awards	1	1
People's Choice Awards	2	5
Primetime Emmy Awards	8	40
PRISM Awards	0	1
Producers Guild of America Awards	1	3
Satellite Awards	5	6
Screen Actors Guild Awards	1	12
TCA Awards	2	5
Writers Guild of America Awards	3	6

Totals (Note: Certain award groups do not simply award one winner. They acknowledge several different recipients, have runners-up, and have third place. Since this is a specific recognition and is different from losing an award, runner-up mentions are considered wins in this award tally. For simplification and to avoid errors, each award in this list has been presumed to have had a prior nomination.)
- Wins: 37
- Nominations: 110

Homeland is a drama/thriller series developed for American television by Howard Gordon and Alex Gansa and based on the Israeli series Hatufim (English title: Prisoners of War) created by Gideon Raff. The series stars Claire Danes as Carrie Mathison, a Central Intelligence Agency officer and Damian Lewis as Nicholas Brody, a U.S. Marine. Mathison has come to believe that Brody, who was held captive by al-Qaeda as a prisoner of war, was turned by the enemy and now threatens the United States.

The series is broadcast in the United States on the cable channel Showtime, and is produced by Fox 21. It premiered on October 2, 2011. The first episode was made available online, more than two weeks before broadcast, with viewers having to complete some tasks to unlock access. The series has received critical acclaim, as well as several industry awards, including winning the 2012 Primetime Emmy Award for Outstanding Drama Series, the Golden Globe Award for Best Television Series – Drama, and the Primetime Emmy Award for Outstanding Lead Actor in a Drama Series and Lead Actress in a Drama Series for Damian Lewis and Claire Danes, respectively. Showtime renewed the series for a second season of twelve episodes, which premiered on September 30, 2012.

== Total nominations and awards for the cast ==
Actor	Awards	Nominations
Claire Danes	10	23
Damian Lewis	3	8
Mandy Patinkin	0	5
Morena Baccarin	0	1

== Primetime Emmy Awards ==
Year	Category	Nominee(s)	Episode(s)	Result
2012	Outstanding Drama Series	Alex Gansa, Howard Gordon, Michael Cuesta, Gideon Raff, Avi Nir, Ran Telem, Chip Johannessen, Alexander Cary, Henry Bromell, Meredith Stiehm, Michael Klick	"Pilot" & "Grace", "The Good Soldier" & "The Weekend", "Marine One"	Won
2012	Outstanding Lead Actor in a Drama Series	Damian Lewis	"Marine One"	Won
2012	Outstanding Lead Actress in a Drama Series	Claire Danes	"The Vest"	Won
2012	Outstanding Directing for a Drama Series	Michael Cuesta	"Pilot"	Nominated
2012	Outstanding Writing for a Drama Series	Alex Gansa, Howard Gordon, Gideon Raff	"Pilot"	Won
2013	Outstanding Drama Series	Alex Gansa, Howard Gordon, Michael Cuesta, Gideon Raff, Avi Nir, Meredith Stiehm, Ran Telem, Chip Johannessen, Alexander Cary, Henry Bromell, Michael Klick	"The Smile", "Beirut Is Back", "New Car Smell", "Q&A", "In Memoriam", "The Choice"	Nominated
2013	Outstanding Lead Actor in a Drama Series	Damian Lewis	"Q&A"	Nominated
2013	Outstanding Lead Actress in a Drama Series	Claire Danes	"Q&A"	Won
2013	Outstanding Supporting Actor in a Drama Series	Mandy Patinkin	"The Choice"	Nominated
2013	Outstanding Supporting Actress in a Drama Series	Morena Baccarin	"State of Independence"	Nominated
2013	Outstanding Guest Actor in a Drama Series	Rupert Friend	"Q&A"	Nominated
2013	Outstanding Directing for a Drama Series	Lesli Linka Glatter	"Q&A"	Nominated
2013	Outstanding Writing for a Drama Series	Henry Bromell	"Q&A"	Won
2014	Outstanding Lead Actress in a Drama Series	Claire Danes	"The Star"	Nominated
2014	Outstanding Supporting Actor in a Drama Series	Mandy Patinkin	"Gerontion"	Nominated
2015	Outstanding Drama Series	Alex Gansa, Howard Gordon, Alexander Cary, Chip Johannessen, Lesli Linka Glatter, Meredith Stiehm, Gideon Raff, Avi Nir, Ran Telem, Patrick Harbinson, Michael Klick, Claire Danes, Lauren White	"From A to B and Back Again", Redux", "Halfway to a Donut", "There's Something Else Going On", "13 Hours in Islamabad", "Krieg Nicht Lieb"	Nominated
2015	Outstanding Lead Actress in a Drama Series	Claire Danes	"From A to B and Back Again"	Nominated
2015	Outstanding Guest Actor in a Drama Series	F. Murray Abraham	"Long Time Coming"	Nominated
2015	Outstanding Directing for a Drama Series	Lesli Linka Glatter	"From A to B and Back Again"	Nominated
2016	Outstanding Drama Series	Alex Gansa, Howard Gordon, Alexander Cary, Chip Johannessen, Lesli Linka Glatter, Meredith Stiehm, Gideon Raff, Avi Nir, Ran Telem, Patrick Harbinson, Michael Klick, Claire Danes, Ron Nyswaner, Ted Mann, Benjamin Cavell, Lauren White, Katie O'Hara	"The Tradition of Hospitality", Why Is This Night Different?", "All About Allison", "The Litvinov Ruse", "Our Man in Damascus", "A False Glimmer"	Nominated
2016	Outstanding Lead Actress in a Drama Series	Claire Danes	"Super Powers"	Nominated
2016	Outstanding Directing for a Drama Series	Lesli Linka Glatter	"The Tradition of Hospitality"	Nominated
2017	Outstanding Supporting Actor in a Drama Series	Mandy Patinkin	"America First"	Nominated
2017	Outstanding Directing for a Drama Series	Lesli Linka Glatter	"America First"	Nominated
2018	Outstanding Supporting Actor in a Drama Series	Mandy Patinkin	"Species Jump"	Nominated
2018	Outstanding Guest Actor in a Drama Series	F. Murray Abraham	"All In"	Nominated
2020	Outstanding Directing for a Drama Series	Lesli Linka Glatter	"Prisoners of War"	Nominated

=== Creative Arts Primetime Emmy Awards ===
Year	Category	Nominee(s)	Episode(s)	Result
2012	Outstanding Casting for a Drama Series	Junie Lowry Johnson, Libby Goldstein, Judy Henderson, Craig Fincannon, Lisa Mae Fincannon		Won
2012	Outstanding Single-Camera Picture Editing for a Drama Series	Jordan Goldman, David Latham	"Pilot"	Won
2012	Outstanding Original Main Title Theme Music	Sean Callery		Nominated
2012	Outstanding Sound Mixing for a Comedy or Drama Series (One Hour)	Larry Long, Nello Torri, Alan Decker, Larold Rebhun	"Marine One"	Nominated
2013	Outstanding Casting for a Drama Series	Junie Lowry Johnson, Libby Goldstein, Judy Henderson, Craig Fincannon, Lisa Mae Fincannon		Nominated
2013	Outstanding Cinematography for a Single-Camera Series	Nelson Cragg	"Beirut Is Back"	Nominated
2013	Outstanding Sound Mixing for a Comedy or Drama Series (One Hour)	Larry Long, Nello Torri, Alan Decker, Larold Rebhun	"Beirut Is Back"	Nominated
2014	Outstanding Cinematography for a Single-Camera Series	David Klein	"The Star"	Nominated
2014	Outstanding Sound Mixing for a Comedy or Drama Series (One Hour)	Larry Long, Nello Torri, Alan Decker, Larold Rebhun	"Good Night"	Nominated
2015	Outstanding Sound Mixing for a Comedy or Drama Series (One Hour)	Dieter Keck, Nello Torri, Alan Decker, Larold Rebhun	"Redux"	Nominated
2016	Outstanding Cinematography for a Single-Camera Series	David Klein	"The Tradition of Hospitality"	Nominated
2017	Outstanding Sound Editing for a Series	Craig A. Dellinger, Ryne Gierke, Eric Raber, Shawn Kennelly, Jeff Charbonneau, Melissa Kennelly & Vince Nicastro	"America First"	Nominated
2018	Outstanding Sound Editing for a Comedy or Drama Series (One-Hour)	Craig A. Dellinger, Eric Raber, Ian Shedd, Ryne Gierke, Shawn Kennelly, Jeff Charbonneau, Melissa Kennelly & Vince Nicastro	"All In"	Nominated

== Golden Globe Awards ==
Year	Category	Nominee(s)	Result
2012	Best Television Series – Drama		Won
2012	Best Actress – Television Series Drama	Claire Danes	Won
2012	Best Actor – Television Series Drama	Damian Lewis	Nominated
2013	Best Television Series – Drama		Won
2013	Best Actress – Television Series Drama	Claire Danes	Won
2013	Best Actor – Television Series Drama	Damian Lewis	Won
2013	Best Supporting Actor – Series, Miniseries or Television Film	Mandy Patinkin	Nominated
2015	Best Actress – Television Series Drama	Claire Danes	Nominated

== Critics' Choice Awards ==
Year	Category	Nominee(s)	Result
2012	Best Drama Series		Won
2012	Best Actress in a Drama Series	Claire Danes	Won
2012	Best Actor in a Drama Series	Damian Lewis	Nominated
2013	Best Drama Series		Nominated
2013	Best Actress in a Drama Series	Claire Danes	Nominated
2013	Best Actor in a Drama Series	Damian Lewis	Nominated
2015	Best Drama Series		Nominated
2015	Best Supporting Actor in a Drama Series	Mandy Patinkin	Nominated
2021	Best Actress in a Drama Series	Claire Danes	Nominated

== Screen Actors Guild Awards ==
Year	Category	Nominee(s)	Result
2013	Outstanding Performance by a Female Actor in a Drama Series	Claire Danes	Won
2013	Outstanding Performance by a Male Actor in a Drama Series	Damian Lewis	Nominated
2013	Outstanding Performance by an Ensemble in a Drama Series		Nominated
2014	Outstanding Performance by a Female Actor in a Drama Series	Claire Danes	Nominated
2014	Outstanding Performance by an Ensemble in a Drama Series		Nominated
2014	Outstanding Performance by a Stunt Ensemble in a Television Series		Nominated
2015	Outstanding Performance by a Female Actor in a Drama Series	Claire Danes	Nominated
2015	Outstanding Performance by an Ensemble in a Drama Series		Nominated
2015	Outstanding Performance by a Stunt Ensemble in a Television Series		Nominated
2016	Outstanding Performance by a Female Actor in a Drama Series	Claire Danes	Nominated
2016	Outstanding Performance by an Ensemble in a Drama Series		Nominated
2016	Outstanding Performance by a Stunt Ensemble in a Television Series		Nominated

== TCA Awards ==
Year	Category	Nominee(s)	Result
2012	Program of the Year		Nominated
2012	Outstanding Achievement in Drama		Nominated
2012	Outstanding New Program		Won
2012	Individual Achievement in Drama	Claire Danes	Won
2013	Outstanding Achievement in Drama		Nominated

== Satellite Awards ==
Year	Category	Nominee(s)	Result
2011	Best Actress – Television Series Drama	Claire Danes	Won
2012	Best Television Series – Drama		Won
2012	Best Actress – Television Series Drama	Claire Danes	Won
2012	Best Actor – Television Series Drama	Damian Lewis	Won
2014	Best Television Series – Drama		Nominated
2016	Best Actress – Television Series Drama	Claire Danes	Won

== Writers Guild of America Awards ==
Year	Category	Nominee(s)	Episode(s)	Result
2012	Best Dramatic Series	Henry Bromell, Alexander Cary, Alex Gansa, Howard Gordon, Chip Johannessen, Gideon Raff, Meredith Stiehm		Nominated
2012	Best New Series	Henry Bromell, Alexander Cary, Alex Gansa, Howard Gordon, Chip Johannessen, Gideon Raff, Meredith Stiehm		Won
2012	Best Episodic Drama	Henry Bromell	"The Good Soldier"	Won
2013	Best Dramatic Series	Henry Bromell, Alexander Cary, Alex Gansa, Howard Gordon, Chip Johannessen, Meredith Stiehm		Nominated
2013	Best Episodic Drama	Meredith Stiehm	"New Car Smell"	Nominated
2019	Best Episodic Drama	Alex Gansa	"Paean to the People"	Won

== Other awards ==
Year	Award	Category	Nominee(s)	Work	Result
2011	AFI Awards	Best Television Programs of The Year		Season 1	Won
2012	AFI Awards	Best Television Programs of The Year		Season 2	Won
2015	AFI Awards	Best Television Programs of The Year		Season 5	Won
2012	American Cinema Editors Award	Best Edited One-Hour Series For Non-Commercial Television	Jordan Goldman, David Latham	"Pilot"	Won
2012	Edgar Award	Best Television Episode Teleplay	Gideon Raff, Howard Gordon, Alex Gansa	"Pilot"	Won
2013	Edgar Award	Best Television Episode Teleplay	Meredith Stiehm	"New Car Smell"	Nominated
2012	Directors Guild of America Award	Outstanding Directorial Achievement in Dramatic Series	Michael Cuesta	"Pilot"	Nominated
2013	Directors Guild of America Award	Outstanding Directorial Achievement in Dramatic Series	Lesli Linka Glatter	"Q&A"	Nominated
2013	Directors Guild of America Award	Outstanding Directorial Achievement in Dramatic Series	Michael Cuesta	"The Choice"	Nominated
2014	Directors Guild of America Award	Outstanding Directorial Achievement in Dramatic Series	Lesli Linka Glatter	"The Star"	Nominated
2015	Directors Guild of America Award	Outstanding Directorial Achievement in Dramatic Series	Lesli Linka Glatter	"From A to B and Back Again"	Won
2015	Directors Guild of America Award	Outstanding Directorial Achievement in Dramatic Series	Dan Attias	"13 Hours in Islamabad"	Nominated
2016	Directors Guild of America Award	Outstanding Directorial Achievement in Dramatic Series	Lesli Linka Glatter	"The Tradition of Hospitality"	Nominated
2021	Directors Guild of America Award	Outstanding Directorial Achievement in Dramatic Series	Lesli Linka Glatter	"Prisoners of War"	Won
2011	Peabody Award	Area of Excellence			Won
2013	People's Choice Awards	Favorite Thriller Show			Nominated
2014	People's Choice Awards	Favorite Premium Cable TV show			Won
2014	People's Choice Awards	Favorite Premium Cable TV Actress	Claire Danes		Nominated
2016	People's Choice Awards	Favorite Premium Cable TV show			Won
2016	People's Choice Awards	Favorite Premium Cable TV Actress	Claire Danes		Nominated
2012	PRISM Award	Female Performance in a Drama Series Multi-Episode Storyline	Claire Danes		Nominated
2013	Producers Guild of America Awards	Producers Guild of America Award for Best Episodic Drama			Won
2014	Producers Guild of America Awards	Producers Guild of America Award for Best Episodic Drama			Nominated
2016	Producers Guild of America Awards	Producers Guild of America Award for Best Episodic Drama			Nominated
