= Redux (Homeland) =

- Homeland episode
- Episode no.: Season 4 Episode 7
- Directed by: Carl Franklin
- Written by: Alexander Cary
- Production code: 4WAH07
- Original air date: November 9, 2014
- Running time: 51 minutes

Guest appearances
- Damian Lewis as Nicholas Brody; Michael O'Keefe as John Redmond; Numan Acar as Haissam Haqqani; Maury Sterling as Max; Raza Jaffrey as Aasar Khan; Mark Moses as Dennis Boyd; Nimrat Kaur as Tasneem Qureishi; Art Malik as Bunran Latif; Shavani Seth as Kiran; Alex Lanipekun as Hank Wonham

Episode chronology
← Previous "From A to B and Back Again"	Next → "Halfway to a Donut"
- Homeland season 4

"Redux" is the seventh episode of the fourth season of the American television drama series Homeland, and the 43rd episode overall. It premiered on Showtime on November 9, 2014.

== Plot ==
With the news that Saul Berenson (Mandy Patinkin) has been abducted, CIA Director Andrew Lockhart (Tracy Letts) arrives in Pakistan. Lockhart, Martha Boyd (Laila Robins), Carrie (Claire Danes), and other representatives from the U.S. Embassy meet with a delegation of Pakistani intelligence officials. Lockhart accuses the ISI of being complicit with Haissam Haqqani (Numan Acar), and declares that the U.S. will suspend its federal aid to Pakistan if Saul is not returned safely. Martha, appalled that Lockhart undermined her and potentially sabotaged her working relationships, nearly resigns as ambassador, but Dennis (Mark Moses) convinces her to reconsider. Martha starts reaching out to her contacts in an effort to secure Saul's return.

Haqqani boasts to Saul that he can now move about the country freely without fear of drone strikes, due to the presence of Saul as a "human shield". With Saul in tow, Haqqani visits his wife and children, who he hasn't seen in three years.

At a pharmacy, Tasneem Qureishi (Nimrat Kaur) picks up some pills that have been filled with an unidentified powder. Dennis breaks into Carrie's apartment and replaces some of her Clozapine pills with the pills that Tasneem acquired. Carrie eventually takes the substituted pills and soon begins to suffer the effects. After lashing out in the operations room, she realizes something is wrong and retires to her room for a nap.

Saul is taken to a dwelling near the Afghanistan border where Haqqani informs him that his release is currently being negotiated in exchange for several prisoners.

Carrie is awakened by a call from Max (Maury Sterling) who has located Aayan's girlfriend Kiran (Shavani Seth). Not feeling any relief from her pills, Carrie takes more. Becoming increasingly paranoid and hallucinating, she heads to the hospital where Kiran is working. Carrie asks Kiran the purpose of the medicine Aayan was retrieving for Haqqani, but only repels her with her overly aggressive questioning. A security guard tries to restrain Carrie, but, while hallucinating that he is Quinn (Rupert Friend), she attacks him and runs into the streets. Carrie shoots two men who approach her before turning her gun on the police, but then realizes she's not even holding a gun. The police apprehend her and deliver her to a house where she is greeted by Nicholas Brody (Damian Lewis). Carrie is shocked that Brody is alive and initially doesn't trust what she's seeing. She breaks down crying in his arms, and admits that she had been willing to let him die. After an emotional reunion, it is revealed that it's been another hallucination, and Carrie is actually crying in the arms of ISI colonel Aasar Khan (Raza Jaffrey) who is asking her "Who's Brody?"

== Production ==
The episode was directed by Carl Franklin and written by executive producer Alexander Cary.

The episode features a special appearance by former series regular Damian Lewis as Nicholas Brody in a hallucination of Carrie's. To keep Lewis's appearance a secret, Showtime did not send out an advance screener to the press.

== Reception ==
=== Ratings ===
The original broadcast of the episode was watched by 1.55 million viewers, which was roughly equal with the previous episode.

=== Critical response ===
Price Peterson of New York magazine gave the episode 4 out of 5 stars, calling it "another terrific episode", and praising the depiction of Carrie's perspective while she was drugged. The A.V. Club's Josh Modell gave the episode a "B+" grade, noting that it did well in exploring the various ways the U.S. would attempt to recover a hostage.
