= Halfway to a Donut =

- Homeland episode
- Episode no.: Season 4 Episode 8
- Directed by: Alex Graves
- Written by: Chip Johannessen
- Production code: 4WAH08
- Original air date: November 16, 2014
- Running time: 49 minutes

Guest appearances
- Mark Moses as Dennis Boyd; Raza Jaffrey as Aasar Khan; Nimrat Kaur as Tasneem Qureishi; Michael O'Keefe as John Redmond; Numan Acar as Haissam Haqqani; Art Malik as Bunran Latif

Episode chronology
← Previous "Redux"	Next → "There's Something Else Going On"
- Homeland season 4

"Halfway to a Donut" is the eighth episode of the fourth season of the American television drama series Homeland, and the 44th episode overall. It premiered on Showtime on November 16, 2014.

== Plot ==
Carrie (Claire Danes) wakes up in Aasar Khan's house (Raza Jaffrey) with no memory of how she got there. She correctly suspects that she was poisoned by means of her medicine, but Khan denies involvement.

In a live video, Saul Berenson (Mandy Patinkin) pleads that his country must not negotiate with terrorists. Haissam Haqqani (Numan Acar) appears and announces a list of prisoners that he wishes to be released. While Saul is taken back to his cell, he secretly grabs a nail. Being left alone, he uses the nail to free himself from the handcuffs, and pretends to hang himself. When a guard comes to rescue him, he kills the guard, flees, and calls Carrie. Quinn (Rupert Friend) guides Saul to a shop in Makeen where a CIA asset gives him refuge. Saul makes Carrie promise that, if Saul is recaptured, Carrie will kill him and the terrorists together using an airstrike.

Immediately before a meeting between the Americans and the Pakistanis, Khan notices Tasneem Qureishi (Nimrat Kaur) talking to Dennis Boyd (Mark Moses) and passing him a note. During the meeting, Carrie is confused by the Pakistanis' sense of confidence, seeing that Saul got away. She suddenly realizes that the Pakistani military can simply detect the flying drone that is watching over Saul, and give Haqqani those coordinates. As she rushes to the operations room, the Taliban surround the town. To her dismay, they open fire on the extraction team, a disguised van with U.S. Special Forces soldiers. The van is outnumbered and forced to turn back.

Saul, feeling that he is surrounded, prepares to shoot himself. Carrie lies saying that there is another path. She directs Saul out of a building and into a group of Taliban, where he is recaptured. Saul screams and curses at Carrie, realizing that she lied. Faced with such a scene, Lockhart (Tracy Letts) declares that the United States is accepting Haqqani's terms for the prisoner exchange.

Late that night, Carrie is woken by a call from Khan. They meet outdoors, and Khan insists that he did not tamper with Carrie's medicine. Carrie criticizes him for not providing more information, but says that she believes in his innocence. Khan relents and informs her that it was Dennis Boyd working against her.

== Production ==
The episode was directed by Alex Graves and written by executive producer Chip Johannessen.

== Title ==
The title refers to the balushahi, a Pakistani and Indian pastry. Dennis Boyd brings some of them home, and tells his wife Martha, "These are genuine balashahi. That's like halfway to a doughnut."

== Reception ==
=== Ratings ===
The original broadcast of the episode was watched by 1.66 million viewers, an increase of over 100,000 from the previous week.

=== Critical response ===
The episode holds a 100% rating on the review website aggregator Rotten Tomatoes, and calls it "one of the strongest episodes of the season, a tension-filled, high-stakes installment that recalls the best of Homeland's first season.

Price Peterson of New York magazine rated the episode 5 out of 5 stars, naming it "a tremendous hour of television and one of Homeland's finest installments since season one". Josh Modell of The A.V. Club gave the episode an "A−" rating, saying about the scene where Saul threatens suicide: "Homeland doesn’t get any better than that scene, in which two characters that we’re fully invested in are at odds in a life-and-death situation". IGN's Scott Collura assessed it as a "tense and exciting episode", arriving at a 9.0 out of 10 rating.
