= There's Something Else Going On =

- Homeland episode
- Episode no.: Season 4 Episode 9
- Directed by: Seith Mann
- Written by: Patrick Harbinson
- Production code: 4WAH09
- Original air date: November 23, 2014
- Running time: 47 minutes

Guest appearances
- Sarita Choudhury as Mira Berenson; Mark Moses as Dennis Boyd; Michael O'Keefe as John Redmond; Nimrat Kaur as Tasneem Qureishi; Art Malik as Bunran Latif; Raza Jaffrey as Aasar Khan; Alex Lanipekun as Hank Wonham; Numan Acar as Haissam Haqqani

Episode chronology
← Previous "Halfway to a Donut"	Next → "13 Hours in Islamabad"
- Homeland season 4

"There's Something Else Going On" is the ninth episode of the fourth season of the American television drama series Homeland, and the 45th episode overall. It premiered on Showtime on November 23, 2014.

The episode was cited by multiple publications as one of the best television episodes of 2014.

== Plot ==
Carrie (Claire Danes) asks Dennis Boyd (Mark Moses) to confess to helping the ISI, but he denies involvement. In the middle of the session, Martha Boyd (Laila Robins) pulls Dennis out and reprimands Carrie, but this is shown to be a ploy, as Martha agrees with Carrie's suspicions. Martha later catches Dennis trying to escape the embassy and locks him up.

During the prisoner exchange, the CIA and ISI stand at opposite ends of an airstrip. Both sides release their prisoners at the same time. A teenage boy wearing a suicide vest follows along with Saul (Mandy Patinkin). At this point, Saul sits down and refuses to move because he does not wish to see those prisoners go free. Carrie approaches Saul and pleads with him. Finally, Saul agrees and rises up, and the exchange succeeds.

On the way back to the embassy, the three-car convoy transporting Saul and Carrie is struck by two RPGs. The CIA staff detect the explosions, and Lockhart (Tracy Letts) sends the embassy's security guards to the scene. When Martha visits Dennis in the cell, and tells him what happened, it occurs to Dennis that the explosions are a diversion for an attack on the embassy. He confesses to Martha that he told Tasneem Qureishi (Nimrat Kaur) about the embassy's hidden tunnel.

Haissam Haqqani (Numan Acar) and a platoon of soldiers, all armed with assault rifles, make use of the tunnel and get inside.

== Production ==
The episode was directed by Seith Mann and written by co-executive producer Patrick Harbinson.

== Reception ==
=== Ratings ===
The original broadcast of the episode was watched by 1.77 million viewers, an increase of over 100,000 from the previous week.

=== Critical response ===
The review aggregator website Rotten Tomatoes reported a 100% approval rating from critics based on 11 reviews. The website's consensus reads, "'There's Something Else Going On' is an apt title for this episode of Homeland, which ably balances nerve-rattling action with continuously suspenseful plotting."

Cynthia Littleton of Variety said "Homeland's ninth episode, 'There’s Something Else Going On,' was a combustible mix of action, nail-biting tension and plot twists and turns. In the middle of all this, the show has made its way back to holding a mirror up to U.S. foreign policy action". Alyssa Rosenberg of The Washington Post lauded the episode for its "two great, tense sequences, the second even better for coming as a genuine shock". New York magazine's Price Peterson rated the episode 5 out of 5 stars, adding that "this week's episode was the season's best yet". Peterson highlighted the unpredictability of the writing, as well as the performances of Claire Danes and Mandy Patinkin in the prisoner exchange scene, saying "these two next-level actors have never been better as their back-and-forth concisely spelled out the entire premise of the show".

Entertainment Weekly named it the fifth best television episode of 2014, stating, "It was classic Homeland—and we mean that, once again, in a good way." TV Guide named it the third best television episode of the year, remarking that it had "all the suspense and entertainment as some of the most highly regarded action movies" and that "Mandy Patinkin delivers his strongest work on the series to date".
