= Tasneem Qureishi =

Fictional character on the American television/drama thriller Homeland

- Homeland character
- Nimrat Kaur as Tasneem Qureishi (2020)
- First appearance: "Iron in the Fire"; October 19, 2014
- Last appearance: "Prisoners of War"; April 26, 2020
- Created by: Alex Gansa; Howard Gordon
- Portrayed by: Nimrat Kaur

In-universe information
- Gender: Female
- Occupation: Inter-Services Intelligence (ISI) agent; Director-General of Inter-Services Intelligence
- Relatives: Bunran "Bunny" Latif (stepfather)

Tasneem Qureishi is a fictional character on the American television series Homeland on Showtime, created by Alex Gansa and Howard Gordon. Portrayed by Indian actress Nimrat Kaur in season four (2014) and season eight (2020), Tasneem is an Inter-Services Intelligence (ISI) agent in Pakistan, and later the organization's Director-General.

Known for her starring role in the 2013 film The Lunchbox, Kaur was cast as the season four nemesis of American Central Intelligence Agency (CIA) agent Carrie Mathison, the character played by series star Claire Danes. The role of Tasneem was Kaur's first time portraying a villain. She was surprised to be asked back for the show's final season, since the story had moved away from Pakistan after season four.

Tasneem is introduced as a devious ISI agent who will do anything to advance the interests of the ISI and her secret Taliban allies, which may conflict with those of the CIA. She is presented as a villain, but showrunner Gansa explained that though Tasneem is ruthless, she has understandable motives and is only serving her country. In the final season, she has risen to leader of the ISI, a position which historically has always been held by a man in the real world. Tasneem comes into direct conflict with Carrie's mentor, US National Security Advisor Saul Berenson (Mandy Patinkin), but becomes his reluctant ally as the interests of Pakistan and the US increasingly align.

In season four, Tasneem blackmails the husband of the US ambassador to supply her with secret intelligence. Having already orchestrated the assassination of the CIA chief of station in Pakistan, Tasneem orders Saul's kidnapping by the Taliban, which prevents the new chief of station, Carrie, from capturing or killing Taliban commander Haissam Haqqani (Numan Acar). Learning that Carrie has bipolar disorder, Tasneem tampers with her medication, hoping that Carrie's inevitable mental breakdown will get her out of Islamabad. Later, a convoy transporting Carrie and Saul is attacked, and Tasneem intentionally delays the dispatch of Pakistani military assistance. Meanwhile, Tasneem has passed along to Haqqani her discovery of a hidden tunnel into the US embassy, which he uses to invade the embassy.

In season eight, Tasneem is now Director-General of the ISI, and Saul is the US National Security Advisor. Critical of US foreign policy, Tasneem is not supportive of Saul's efforts to broker peace between Afghanistan and the Taliban. Saul arranges a secret meeting in Pakistan with Haqqani, now leader of the Taliban, but Tasneem learns of it. She attempts to assassinate Haqqani and replace him with his son Jalal (Elham Ehsas), but Haqqani survives. The deaths of the US president and Afghan president in a helicopter crash lead to the arrest of Haqqani, who Saul does not believe is responsible. Tasneem agrees to help Saul stall the trial, but they fail and Haqqani is executed. An empowered Jalal reinvigorates the Taliban and becomes a problem for Tasneem, who has lost the power to control him. Seeking to ease escalating tensions between the US and Pakistan, Tasneem provides Saul with intel to distract the trigger-happy new US president away from a potential invasion of Pakistan.

Tasneem has been repeatedly called the character viewers "love to hate", and Kaur has been praised for her performance.

== Appearances ==
Kaur debuted in the "major recurring role" of Tasneem Qureishi in the season four episode "Iron in the Fire" (October 2014), and appeared in nine episodes that season. She reprised the role as a series regular in the 2020 eighth and final season of Homeland.

== Casting and production ==
Kaur credited her starring role in the 2013 film The Lunchbox for bringing her to the attention of the producers of Homeland. She said, "It was quite serendipitous; I was in London and they called me for the audition and it just happened." Kaur arrived in London on a Sunday morning and had her audition on the Monday. She was notified two or three days later that she had landed the role. Prior to her audition, Kaur had heard of but never seen Homeland, and she watched the pilot after completing her screen test. She said, "After I got back to India, I binged on previous seasons of Homeland and I am a convert now. I completely understand why viewers love it so much and I am all the more excited to be a part of it."

Best known at the time for The Lunchbox, Kaur was not used to playing a villain, and later said, "I credit [the casting directors] for imagining that I could take on this role. It was a risk for them". She said of the role, "I really had an incredible time playing a negative part for the first time. That was very exciting and a lot of fun for me." She noted, "I would be behind bars if I did the kind of things I am doing as Tasneem. You can get away with so much on screen. It's exciting to bring legitimacy to a part that you don't exactly agree with on any count". Kaur was told her character would be the mysterious nemesis of Carrie Mathison, the character played by series star Claire Danes, but initially she did not know whether she would perform in scenes with Danes. She said, "Initially I was told I would be part of five episodes. After I landed in Cape Town, they said seven." Kaur would ultimately appear until the end of the season. She believed that "Homeland would be my real introduction to the western audience because it already has a great viewership and fan following. I feel I have a big responsibility to be as true to the story as possible." She confirmed in 2019 that her role in Homeland had contributed to her being cast in other projects.

In Fall 2018, Gansa asked Kaur if she would reprise the role of Tasneem for season eight. She was surprised, not expecting the character to return, explaining that "it was always a one-season stint. After season four it went into different cities and different chapters and the narrative changed completely." She said, "They wanted my character to return because it did well for them." According to Kaur, for the last season "they wanted to circle back to what they call the longest war of America: Afghanistan". When preparing for season eight, she reread the scripts for season four but did not rewatch her performance, which she thought would "take away from the fun of defining who she is now [in season eight]". The actress was eager to reprise the role, and said, "The opportunity to play [Tasneem] again and to jump into that universe is exciting." Kaur noted, "I’m a part of the huge finale, which is great, considering it's a farewell to all the fans."

Though Tasneem is Pakistani and Kaur is Indian, Kaur used her own dialect. She said, "I'm playing South Asian, I am South Asian. I'm an Indian girl, and India and Pakistan as we all know, we're pretty much the same." Kaur added some dialogue in the Punjabi language in both seasons four and eight, since many Pakistani Muslims and Sikhs speak it. She explained, "Our origins are all in Pakistan ... they're all kind of integrated: Pakistani, Sikhs, or Muslims who speak in Punjabi. ... so I had based her as somebody from that kind of a milieu. So she would interact with the house help in Punjabi, for instance." Kaur said, "Physically and costume referencing and all that, you have a lot of very interesting Pakistani women who present themselves in a very very interesting way. Their body language is very restrained, and [Tasneem's] body language in particular had to be very unapproachable, inaccessible, somebody who's just out there doing her job and is very aware of being probably the only woman in an all-man environment." Kaur also collaborated with the costume designer to assure the regional accuracy of what her character wore, which was a challenge to source in Casablanca, Morocco where they were filming.

Kaur started her work on season four in June 2014, filming in Cape Town, South Africa. She filmed season eight in Northern African locations like the Moroccan cities of Casablanca, Marrakesh and Rabat.

== Characterization ==
=== Season four ===
Tasneem is introduced in 2014 as a "mysterious woman" who blackmails Dennis Boyd (Mark Moses), and whom Josh Modell of The A.V. Club called "a sexy Pakistani agent" who may be "ISI or a terrorist or both". She is later revealed to be a high-ranking Pakistani ISI officer who, though her country is an ally of the United States, is plotting against the Central Intelligence Agency (CIA) chief of station in Islamabad, Carrie Mathison (Claire Danes). Positioned as Carrie's ISI counterpart and nemesis, Tasneem has been categorized as a villain. Mike Guiducci of Vogue described Tasneem as "a spy as insidious as she is smug", and called the character "one of television's most treacherous new villains." Homeland's executive producer and showrunner Alex Gansa said:

Over the years, Homeland has paraded, for lack of a better word, one villain after another. Our goal is always to create somebody whose attitudes and whose beliefs are understandable in a way beyond just being plain evil. And I think Tasneem, a fantastic villain from season four, is a prime example of that. She's villainous in the fact that she's ruthless, but she's doing it in the service of her country and her own country's national interest.

Kaur explained, "She doesn't think she's a villain; she believes she's serving a purpose and whatever she's doing towards getting to that purpose is right. For them, maybe the rest of the world is villainous." She said, "Tasneem is a mysterious and enigmatic girl and the best part is there is so much going on beyond that devious smile of hers. She is a seductress and knows how to get her work done." The actress noted that playing a Pakistani government official was not as much of a challenge as portraying "a woman in a position of power in such a patriarchal society." Kaur said, "That was a very exciting space to explore, as an actor." She added, "For me, she's just a kickass woman. She's an inspiration. I'm a woman first, then comes nationality and the profession. My choices come from places of what I face as a woman.” Noting that Tasneem "is an out and out grey character and I had to train myself to be comfortable playing the part", Kaur said of the character:

Everybody has negatives and positives in them and the position people are put in, how they react is negative or positive. So I never looked at Tasneem as a negative character, to begin with. For me she was a woman who is tough as nails and has made a spot for herself in a male-dominated environment and that in itself is such an incredible feat considering the world she comes from. I admired her deeply as a character and I went about playing it with pride.

Described as "nefarious", "dastardly", "odious", "sinister", "terrifying", "quietly frightening", and "scarily beautiful", Tasneem is established as a Taliban sympathizer, colluding with wanted Taliban commander Haissam Haqqani (Numan Acar). David Crow of Den of Geek described Tasneem's concern for Haqqani's safety as "disquietingly uncomfortable (and believable)". Metro New York suggested that the ISI's motivation to help Haqqani is not because they are pro-Taliban, but because "Haqqani was just an ugly means to an end where a new CIA Director allows Pakistan to operate without America breathing down its neck." Ethan Sacks of the New York Daily News wrote of "Tasneem glaring at her American counterparts, her beautiful head full of duplicity." Gwilym Mumford of The Guardian noted that "poker-faced Tasneem is as shrewd as they come", and Kat Rosenfield of Entertainment Weekly wrote that the character "keeps smirking with all the subtlety of a cat that just ate about 500 canaries."

Deeming Tasneem "pretty badass", Metro New York noted, "She smiles the whole time she speaks with [Dennis Boyd] in every exchange, although everything she says to him threatens his very core". Tasneem arranges for Carrie's CIA mentor Saul Berenson (Mandy Patinkin) to be abducted and delivered to the Taliban, and HuffPost called Tasneem a "terrible human being" when she tampers with the medication Carrie takes for her bipolar disorder. Emma Dibdin of Digital Spy wrote that "having Carrie's reliance on medication exploited as a weakness was a chilling and believable turn that made [Tasneem] seem a genuinely formidable threat." When Saul and Carrie are under fire from the Taliban and Tasneem delays military assistance, Mumford wrote of Tasneem, "She's a terrifyingly cool customer. Such a tiny gesture, done so nonchalantly, but the implications are huge." Kaur said that as an actress, "It was exciting to say the three words 'Wait 10 minutes' knowing the massacre it would cause."

Dee Lockett of Slate described Tasneem as "a sharp, deceptive agent" and "the Pakistani version of Carrie". She is shown to be "as smart and tenacious as Carrie", but also "utterly ruthless". Willa Paskin of Slate called her "an agent who was, at last, Carrie's equal", though Den of Geek's David Crow wrote that Tasneem and the ISI are "far more functionally competent" than Carrie and the CIA. Joshua Alston of The A.V. Club explained that Tasneem and her ISI cohorts "look less like stock villains and more like people who make tough decisions because of a patriotism that burns as hot as Carrie's". After learning that Tasneem tampered with her medication, Carrie herself implies that she and Tasneem are not the same. Lockett explained that the characters have "differing opinion about the ethics of war" and notes Tasneem's "seemingly unapologetic ruthlessness", which is "at times, even worse than Carrie's". Slate noted halfway through the season that "smug" Tasneem has been "one step ahead of Carrie and the CIA since Saul's kidnapping", later calling Tasneem the season's "real threat" and noting that she "emasculates most of her male colleagues". She ultimately benefits from the political turbulence she helped unleash in Islamabad, rising to prominence in the political arena and speaking out against the US's presence in the region. Alston wrote that Tasneem had become "hot shit back in Pakistan", and Sonia Saraiya of Salon called the character "a bad guy [who] double-crossed everyone and drove Carrie and Saul out of Pakistan." At the conclusion of season four, both IGN and Entertainment Weekly considered Tasneem triumphant over Carrie, but noted that neither an expected "big face-off between the two female agents" nor a "comeuppance" for Tasneem came to fruition.

=== Season eight ===
In season eight, Tasneem is the Director-General of Inter-Services Intelligence, a position which historically has always been held by a man in the real world. Kaur said, "She's a woman of power in a very unlikely situation ... You don't expect a woman to be in a position like that." She explained, "At a time when she'd typically been married off and had children, she's the DG of the ISI", adding that "she's obviously somebody who has sacrificed a lot. She has overcome and won over a lot to reach where she is." In the first episode of the season, Saul suggests that Tasneem's stepfather, retired Pakistani general Bunran "Bunny" Latif (Art Malik), must be proud of her for "getting the job he always wanted", to which she replies, "I think he'd have preferred grandchildren." Sejia Rankin of Entertainment Weekly wrote that Bunran "has a clear soft spot for the otherwise hardened Tasneem."

Entertainment Weekly and TVLine predicted that Tasneem would be a "major player" in season eight, and Rankin called her "a villain from the days of yore". Explaining that Homeland aims to create a "real debate" by presenting both American and non-American points of view, Danes cited Tasneem's role in the first episode of season eight as an example of a "[Pakistani] politician who's really challenging Saul and making credible, cogent points about the ways that America has failed." Kaur called Tasneem "the face of Pakistan" for season eight, and "a figure of great importance". Showtime described the character as "a member of [Pakistan's] political elite [whose] interest in the Afghan peace deal proves pivotal for Saul", though she is again positioned as an antagonist. Initially, Saul needs Tasneem's cooperation "to make the peace negotiations stick." He has not forgotten how the "shady" Tasneem burned him and Carrie in season four, but as the crisis in Afghanistan intensifies, Saul and Tasneem's interests more closely align, and he seeks her out as a true ally. Kaur described the relationship between Tasneem and Saul in season eight as "high-octane", and noted, "95% percent of my work this season was with Mandy." Emma Fraser of Collider wrote that Tasneem "loves to go toe-to-toe with Saul and Taliban leader Haissam Haqqani." Kaur explained her character's situation:

Where Pakistan comes in the picture is the part that I’m playing where the question is "Where does Pakistan stand on the equation between US and Afghanistan? What do they have to gain and lose?" That is where my character and her motivation and vulnerabilities come in, and that was something I needed to understand. "What do they stand to lose if the US pulled out their troops from Afghanistan? What do they stand to lose if the Taliban collapses and become all-pervasive?" Tasneem Qureishi as the Director-General of the ISI dealing with Saul Berenson and his onslaughts and arguments, whether she agrees with him or not—is she helping him, is she against him, which side is she on, that is what my part has to deal with.

Understanding that she is a potential threat to his plan to broker peace, Saul deceives "the highly nosy Tasneem" as he plots a secret meeting with Haqqani. She figures out what Saul is doing and, with Bunran's approval, attempts to assassinate Haqqani with an RPG. Tasneem conspires with Haqqani's son Jalal (Elham Ehsas) to make him the new leader of the Taliban, which is "a factor complicated by the inconvenient fact that Haqqani isn't dead." Tasneem and the Afghan vice president, Abdul Qadir G'ulom (Mohammad Bakri), are unhappy that a peace deal has been brokered without their involvement, and Rankin wrote that Tasneem's hatred for the Americans and their treaty is "palpable." The announcement of the deal is, according to Rankin, "accentuated by Tasneem's many scowls". Tasneem and G'ulom are quick to believe something is amiss with the delayed arrival of the US and Afghan presidents, but Scott Von Doviak of The A.V. Club noted that they deny to each other any involvement in the deadly crash, "which suggests that even if one of them is responsible, they weren't working on it together."

Hoping to save the deal, Saul goes to Bunran and Tasneem seeking their assistance to prevent Haqqani's immediate execution. Bunran refuses but Tasneem agrees to help. Rankin noted that "Tasneem's change of heart came because Haqqani still sought the peace deal even after she tried to blow his convoy to bits," and Von Doviak wrote that "Tasneem has either seen enough bloodshed or is playing five-dimensional chess with an endgame not yet in sight". Realizing that Jalal's leadership has become problematic, she threatens him with assassination if he does not fall in line. Jalal, however, is empowered by the "terrifying" amount of troops he has assembled, and defies a "spooked" Tasneem, who realizes there is no way to stop him.

Kaur said, "People keep saying that Tasneem is so badass and that while she looks angelic, she is actually so devious and devilish." She called Tasneem "a very empowering character,” noting that "she's calculative and ambitious and that's what attracted me". The actress said, "I got a lot of appreciation for playing such a strong girl in a man's world and taking tough decisions in a place where you would normally not see women in that position of authority." She added, "This season explores her vulnerabilities through her relationship with her stepfather, which gives you an insight into her psyche.” Kaur noted, "Returning to the set after three seasons, I had to go back to the mindset of my character, who has now developed to become a senior officer. Although it is considered a negative role, I saw the potential that this part had. Tasneem is an empowered woman, who has her own reasons and justifications for every move she makes." She said, "I played the antagonist in season four and that's not going to change. I don't know the complete arc of the character yet, so I am not aware whether she softens up in the end. I just have the script of the first few episodes in my hand and she’s up to no good, that much I can tell you ... I'm hoping she gives the Americans a run for their money again." Kaur explained in 2020, "It was difficult for me initially ... I am someone who cringes whenever I watch anything like that in the news and here I am causing all the mess and mayhem. But as soon as I found the dignity in her and the trials and tribulations she lives with, it made me understand her. The gaps that I could fill in about Tasneem and her backstory helped me not judge her."

== Storylines ==
=== Season four ===
In "Iron in the Fire", high-ranking Pakistani ISI agent Tasneem Qureishi approaches Dennis Boyd (Mark Moses), the husband of US ambassador Martha Boyd (Laila Robins), with a proposition. Tasneem is aware that Dennis stole top secret information directly from his wife and passed it along to the recently murdered CIA chief of station in Pakistan. She wants Dennis to continue procuring intel, but for the ISI instead. Spooked, Dennis tries to return to the US, but Tasneem threatens to expose him to the Federal Bureau of Investigation (FBI), thereby sending him to prison for treason and ruining his wife's career. Meanwhile, Carrie Mathison (Claire Danes), the new CIA chief of station in Pakistan, learns that ISI agent Farhad Ghazi (Tamer Burjaq) was involved in her predecessor's murder.

In "About a Boy", Tasneem confers with ISI colonel Aasar Khan (Raza Jaffrey) to compare notes on Carrie and her CIA mentor Saul Berenson (Mandy Patinkin). Intent on learning more about Carrie, including how she is able to come and go from the embassy unobserved, Tasneem gives Dennis a key to Carrie's apartment, but he cannot bring himself to break in. Before Carrie and her team can do anything about Ghazi, he drugs and abducts Saul on Tasneem's orders. Tasneem arrives just in time to prevent Dennis from confessing their arrangement to John Redmond (Michael O'Keefe), the CIA deputy station chief. A disparaging comment from Martha prompts Dennis to do Tasneem's bidding and enter Carrie's apartment, where he photographs various items, including her family photos and medication bottles.

In "From A to B and Back Again", Dennis discovers that Aayan Ibrahim (Suraj Sharma), the nephew of Taliban commander Haissam Haqqani (Numan Acar), has recently been in Carrie's CIA safehouse. Dennis informs Tasneem, and gives her the photos of Carrie's apartment, noting that based on her medication she probably has bipolar disorder. Tasneem tells Dennis he has "a real gift" for spying. Carrie uses Aayan to locate Haqqani, but Tasneem has warned Haqqani that his nephew has been compromised. Haqqani kills Aayan, and Carrie's attempt to capture or kill the Taliban commander is foiled when Saul is revealed as Haqqani's prisoner. In "Redux", Tasneem gives Dennis some unidentified pills, which he places in Carrie's apartment in place of the Clozapine she takes for her bipolar disorder. CIA Director Andrew Lockhart (Tracy Letts) confronts the Pakistani delegation, including Tasneem, and threatens to cut off US aid to Pakistan if Saul is not returned. After taking the replacement pills, Carrie becomes increasingly paranoid and erratic, suffering hallucinations and having violent outbursts.

Carrie recovers in the care of Khan in "Halfway to a Donut", and realizes she was drugged. A furious Tasneem tells Khan she orchestrated Carrie's breakdown to get her out of Islamabad. Khan was unaware, and helped Carrie in order to protect relations with the US. Immediately before a meeting between the Americans and the Pakistanis, Khan notices Tasneem talking to Dennis and passing him a note. Khan meets Carrie in secret and tells her that Dennis is working against her, but does not mention Tasneem's involvement. In "There's Something Else Going On", Carrie confronts Dennis, who denies helping the ISI. Martha believes Carrie's suspicions, and has Dennis detained when he tries to flee the embassy. Carrie and Tasneem represent the CIA and ISI in a tense prisoner exchange for Saul. Tasneem conceals her alliance with the Taliban but is annoyed when Saul tries to martyr himself to prevent the exchange, and allows Carrie to go in alone to convince him. The convoy transporting Carrie and a freed Saul is attacked, which Dennis realizes could be a diversion for an attack on the embassy. He confesses to Martha that he told Tasneem about the embassy's hidden tunnel, just as Haqqani leads an assault team through it.

In the middle of a firefight in "13 Hours in Islamabad", Carrie calls Khan and asks him to send the Pakistani military to her aid. Tasneem insists that he delay making the call for ten minutes to teach the Americans a lesson. She believes they have been insinuating themselves in Pakistani business for too long, and that the US is more their enemy than their friend. Khan is horrified that Tasneem and the ISI are aiding Haqqani, a terrorist who has killed many of Khan's soldiers. At the embassy, Haqqani and his Taliban soldiers gun down multiple embassy personnel and take hostages, whom he begins to execute as the Americans resist his demands for their list of all CIA informants in Pakistan. In "Krieg Nicht Lieb", CIA agent Peter Quinn (Rupert Friend) plots to lure Haqqani out of hiding by leaking a video of Haqqani killing his nephew, accompanied by a call to action. A mob of protesters amasses in front of Haqqani's hideout. Tasneem stresses to Khan that Haqqani's safety is paramount, and says she will hold Khan personally responsible if anything happens to him. The ISI sends hostile Haqqani supporters to the scene to drive the demonstrators away. In "Long Time Coming", Tasneem has benefited from the chaos she helped unleash and becomes a "leading" voice for Pakistan, publicly renouncing any alliance with the US.

=== Season eight ===
Saul, now the National Security Advisor to the US president, is in Doha, Qatar monitoring peace talks between the Taliban and the government of Afghanistan in "Deception Indicated". The Afghan vice president, Abdul Qadir G'ulom (Mohammad Bakri), jeopardizes the negotiations when he announces publicly that he will never release any Taliban prisoners of war, as has been proposed. Saul goes to Tasneem, who is now Director-General of the ISI and is in Qatar observing the talks. Though not surprised that negotiations have fallen apart, she denies Saul's inference that the Pakistani delegation has leaked details of the talks. He is dubious, reminding her about the incident at the US embassy in Islamabad, when she held back her response team for two hours while 36 Americans were murdered. Later, Saul visits Tasneem, who tells him that her stepfather Bunran is not well, as his muscular dystrophy is affecting his vision. Saul asks Tasneem to work with him rather than against him, as both of their countries share a desire for fair and durable peace in the region. Tasneem scoffs, noting that the US's withdrawal from the region after the Soviet–Afghan War brought chaos and civil war on the Pakistani border. She believes that the US-built Afghan state is unstable, and criticizes US foreign policy, suggesting that the US cares more about removing itself from the region than peace.

In "Catch and Release", Tasneem becomes suspicious when Saul pulls five Taliban prisoners from the Guantanamo Bay Naval Base and one of them disappears. Surveillance has indicated to Saul that Haqqani, now the leader of the Taliban, is receptive to ending the hostilities. Saul has secretly sent the fifth prisoner, Haqqani's cousin, to deliver a message to Haqqani in exchange for his freedom. Saul invites Haqqani to meet him in Peshawar, Pakistan. Meanwhile, Tasneem visits Bunran and relates her suspicions that Saul is not in Washington D.C. as she was told, but is in Pakistan to negotiate directly with Haqqani. Noting that it is not in Pakistan's best interest for the United States to control negotiations, Bunran tells Tasneem to do whatever it takes to prevent the meeting. Saul learns that the ISI are converging on his location in Pakistan, and is unable to prevent Haqqani's convoy from being struck by a Pakistani RPG.

In "False Friends", Tasneem assures her informant, Haqqani's son Jalal (Elham Ehsas), that he will succeed his father as leader of Taliban, but both are shocked to learn that Haqqani was not killed in the strike. Jalal is summoned to Peshawar by Haqqani, who deceives his son into incriminating himself by calling Tasneem when he is told his father suspects him. Haqqani spares Jalal's life but casts him out, after which he is rescued by Tasneem. In "Chalk One Up", Tasneem and G'ulom are less than thrilled that the Americans have brokered a deal with the Taliban without them. Tasneem attempts to leave the announcement ceremony at the Presidential Palace but is stopped by Saul, who makes it clear he knows she orchestrated the attack on Haqqani. US President Ralph Warner (Beau Bridges) comes to Afghanistan in person to announce the pending peace treaty with the Taliban, but the helicopter carrying him and Afghan President Daoud (Christopher Maleki) goes down in Taliban-controlled territory. When the presidents' arrival in Kabul is delayed in "Chalk Two Down", Tasneem tells G'ulom she has heard rumors of "helicopters down". They are soon shocked to learn that both presidents are confirmed dead. G'ulom warns Tasneem that the Afghan-Pakistani alliance will break down within hours, and he will no longer be able to guarantee her safety.

Saul visits Bunran at home in Pakistan in "Fucker Shot Me", and is surprised to find Tasneem there as well. She expresses doubt that Saul has recordings of Haqqani espousing peace, but Saul gets her to concede that she knows he has them. Saul wants their aid in somehow delaying Haqqani's trial, as his execution will unleash violence in the area. Bunran lashes out, telling Saul that he and the US are only friendly to Pakistan wheh they need something. Saul accepts the criticism, but reminds them that though US interests would be impacted by a reignited war in Afghanistan, nearby Pakistan would be directly affected. Saul is about to leave empty-handed when Tasneem agrees to help him, saying "I don't want to watch the world burn". They visit the presiding judge in Haqqani's trial to make their case, and Tasneem admits to attempting to assassinate Haqqani because he was pursuing peace. The judge agrees to order a continuance, but she is replaced by another, who immediately orders Haqqani's death.

Now believing that Jalal shot down Warner's helicopter, new US President Benjamin Hayes (Sam Trammell) threatens an invasion of Pakistan unless they hand him over in "In Full Flight". Tasneem, furious with Haqqani's second-in-command Balach (Seear Kohi) for allowing Jalal to assume control of the Taliban, meets with Jalal at his base in the mountains. She commands him to fall in line with her instructions and go to ground, or she will hunt him down and replace him. Jalal refuses and proclaims his independence from Tasneem and the ISI, and she is shocked to see that he commands a huge army. Tasneem visits Bunran, who wants to have Jalal assassinated, but Tasneem insists that the only way to protect Pakistani interests is to keep Jalal alive.

Hoping to resolve the standoff between the US and Pakistan in "The English Teacher", Saul has a backchannel conversation with Tasneem, who is furious about US statements connecting Pakistan to a recent terrorist bombing arranged by Jalal. Saul is equally alarmed and, assuring her they both want the same thing, intimates that all he needs from her are plausible coordinates where Jalal might be found. They both understand that if they give President Hayes a target, he will act on it. Pakistani intelligence soon provides the US with just that, off the record, and the site is promptly destroyed by a US missile. Tasneem demands a United Nations Security Council vote to censure the US for violating Pakistani sovereignty with this action. In the series finale "Prisoners of War", Tasneem makes a public statement in answer to an ultimatum President Hayes has given the Pakistani prime minister. She says that the US "left us no choice but to arm our tactical nuclear weapons", and that "our response to war will be swift and terrible."

== Reception ==
Repeatedly called the character viewers "love to hate", Tasneem has been praised as a "fantastic character", "very compelling", and one of the "two most intriguing characters" of the season. Dee Lockett of Slate and Joshua Alston of The A.V. Club called Tasneem the "best new character", and Roy Priyanka of The Telegraph India called the character "one of the top draws of the fourth season". Lockett deemed Tasneem season four's "most convincing villain", and credited the character with contributing to "Homeland's resurgence". Lockett added that though Tasneem is "the Pakistani version of Carrie", the similarities and differences between the women make Tasneem "such an intriguing addition to the cast."

David Crow of Den of Geek praised the ISI storyline as "one of the best aspects of season four". Alston wrote, "Homeland has long excelled at folding nighttime soap-style plots into its batter, and with the Tasneem and Dennis subplot, the show takes on the contours of a show like Dallas, complete with poisonings and professional sabotage." TV Fanatic called Dennis and Tasneem's actions against Carrie "almost too much", and multiple reviewers hoped Tasneem would be killed off by the end of season four. Alyssa Rosenberg of The Washington Post found it "fascinating" to see Tasneem "step forward as a political leader, calling for an end to diplomatic relations between her country and the United States", and added that "Playing spy vs. spy, rather than spy-vs.-sexy-terrorist, invigorated Homeland tremendously, lending snap and crackle into what had become a rather soggy dynamic." Emma Dibdin of Digital Spy was disappointed by the lack of resolution in Tasneem's storyline in season four. Entertainment Weekly and TV Guide bemoaned that Tasneem never got her "comeuppance".

Kaur has repeatedly expressed how much she loves playing a "mean girl" character fans "love to hate", explaining "that's something I have never heard for any other part that I’ve played." She said, "The audience also gave me a lot of love in a sadistic way, taking me back to my childhood days when I loved to hate [Indian film villain] Mogambo." Kaur added, "People come to me at airports and say they don't like me. It is rewarding to see that people hate this character. It makes me feel 'job well done'."

Willa Paskin of Slate praised the "excellent supporting work from a host of actors, including most especially Nimrat Kaur as ISI agent Tasneem Qureishi". Mike Guiducci of Vogue wrote that Kaur "nailed it" in season four, and Cynthia Littleton of Variety praised Kaur as giving one of season four's "strong performances". Alston noted that "Kaur's shrewd performance left such an impression that she was brought back as a regular for the show's final season", and A Harini Prasad of The New Indian Express commented on her "commendable acting chops" and the "positive response" she has received for her work in the final season.

=== Nominations ===
Kaur was among the cast nominated for Outstanding Performance by an Ensemble in a Drama in the 21st Screen Actors Guild Awards in 2014.

In April 2020, Gold Derby reported that Showtime would be submitting Kaur for an Emmy Award in the category Supporting Actress in a Drama Series.
