= Homeland season 4 =

Season of television series

Homeland
- Season 4
- Blu-ray cover art
- Starring: Claire Danes; Rupert Friend; Nazanin Boniadi; Laila Robins; Tracy Letts; Mandy Patinkin
- No. of episodes: 12

Release
- Original network: Showtime
- Original release: October 5 – December 21, 2014

Season chronology
- ← Previous; Season 3 Next → Season 5

The fourth season of the American television drama series Homeland premiered on October 5, 2014, and concluded on December 21, 2014, on Showtime, consisting of 12 episodes. The series started as a loosely based variation of the two-season run of the Israeli television series Hatufim (English: Prisoners of War) created by Gideon Raff and is developed for American television by Howard Gordon and Alex Gansa. The fourth season was released on Blu-ray and DVD on September 8, 2015, and became available for streaming on Hulu on August 1, 2016.

The season is set in Islamabad, Pakistan, where Carrie acts as CIA station chief and leads the search for Taliban leader Haissam Haqqani.

== Cast and characters ==
=== Main ===
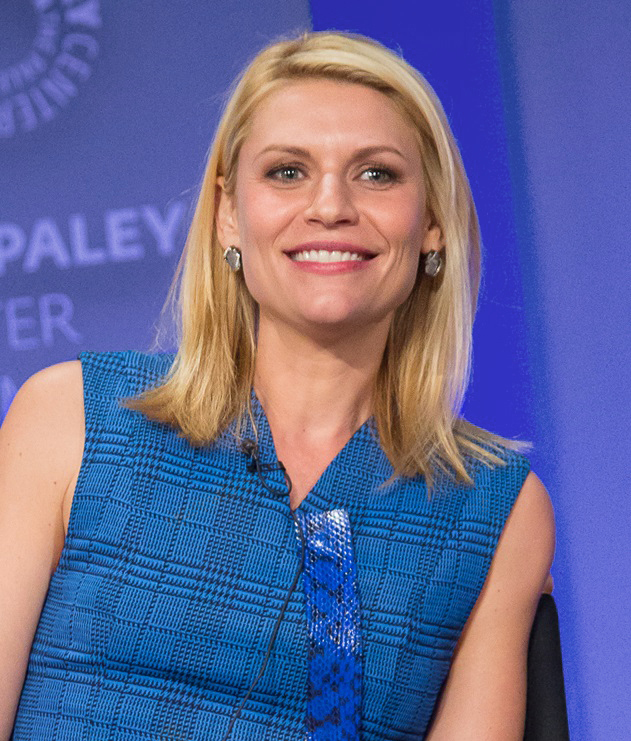
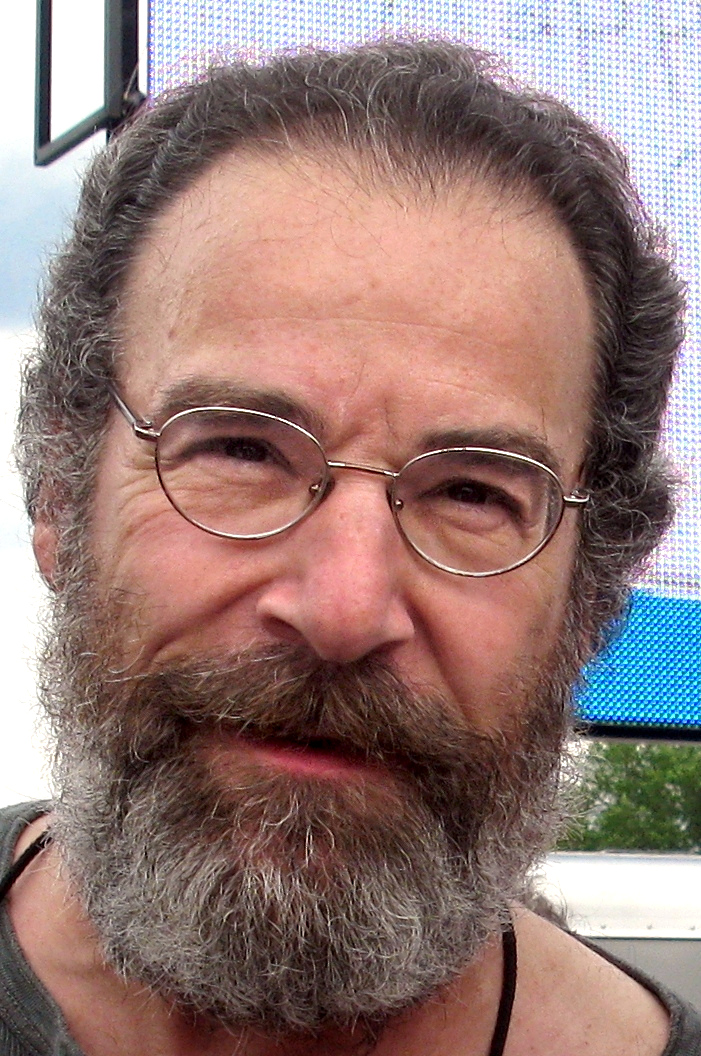
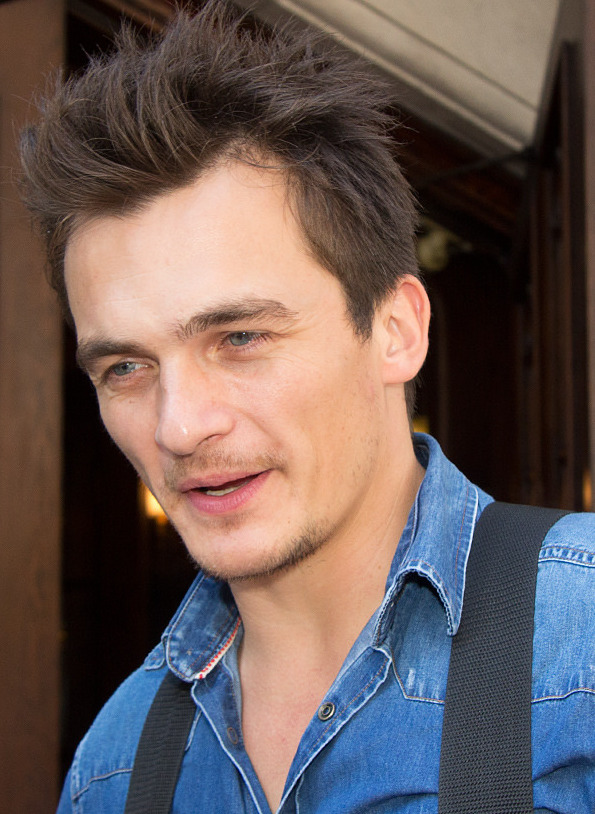
Claire Danes, Mandy Patinkin and Rupert Friend (left to right) portray lead roles Carrie Mathison, Saul Berenson and Peter Quinn, respectively.
- Claire Danes as Carrie Mathison, a CIA intelligence officer assigned to the Counterterrorism Center
- Rupert Friend as Peter Quinn, a CIA SAD/SOG (black ops) operative
- Nazanin Boniadi as Fara Sherazi, a Persian international banking analyst
- Laila Robins as Martha Boyd, the United States ambassador to the Islamic Republic of Pakistan
- Tracy Letts as Andrew Lockhart, the new director of the CIA
- Mandy Patinkin as Saul Berenson, Carrie's old boss and mentor, now working in the private sector

=== Recurring ===
- Suraj Sharma as Aayan Ibrahim, a Pakistani medical student
- Amy Hargreaves as Maggie Mathison, Carrie's sister and a psychiatrist
- Sarita Choudhury as Mira Berenson, Saul's wife
- Alex Lanipekun as Hank Wonham, a CIA officer at the Kabul station
- Akshay Kumar as Rahim, a Pakistani medical student
- Shavani Seth as Kiran, Aayan's girlfriend and fellow medical student
- F. Murray Abraham as Dar Adal, a retired black ops specialist
- Michael O'Keefe as John Redmond, a CIA deputy station chief in Pakistan
- Maury Sterling as Max Piotrowski, a freelance surveillance expert
- Mark Moses as Dennis Boyd, Martha's husband and a political science teacher at Islamabad's Quaid-I-Azam University
- Raza Jaffrey as Aasar Khan, the counter-terrorism chief of Pakistan's ISI
- Nimrat Kaur as Tasneem Qureishi, a member of Pakistan's Inter-Services Intelligence
- Art Malik as Bunran "Bunny" Latif, a retired Pakistani general
- Numan Acar as Haissam Haqqani, a high-priority target and Taliban leader

=== Special guest ===
- Damian Lewis as Nicholas Brody, who appears in a hallucination of Carrie's.

=== Guest ===
- Patrick St. Esprit as Aaron Gage, the CEO of a private defense contractor Saul works for
- Corey Stoll as Sandy Bachman, the CIA station chief in Islamabad
- Adam Godley as Jordan Harris, a CIA case officer
- Emily Walker as Eden, Quinn's landlady with whom he has a brief relationship
- Nina Hoss as Astrid, Quinn's former lover who works for the German embassy
- Victoria Clark as Ellen Mathison, Carrie's mother
- John Getz as Joe Crocker, United States Secretary of State

== Episodes ==
No. overall	No. in season	Title	Directed by	Written by	Original release date	Prod. code	U.S. viewers (millions)
37	1	"The Drone Queen"	Lesli Linka Glatter	Alex Gansa	October 5, 2014	4WAH01	1.61
Carrie, now operating as the CIA station chief in Kabul, authorizes an airstrike on a farmhouse in Pakistan believed to be the whereabouts of Taliban leader Haissam Haqqani. However, reports soon emerge that the airstrike occurred during a wedding, killing Haqqani and 40 other people. Among those killed were the family of medical student Aayan Ibrahim, who survived the airstrike and has a video of the wedding he was filming on his mobile phone at the moment of the strike. One of Aayan's friends uploads the video online against his wishes, creating a rift between the United States government and the Pakistan Armed Forces. Carrie travels to the Islamabad embassy to meet with its station chief, Sandy Bachman. Before Carrie arrives, Sandy leaves the embassy without protection to meet with the secret source of his intelligence on Haqqani. At the same time, Sandy's identity is leaked to the Pakistani press and his face is shown on the television news. Carrie and Quinn attempt to pick Sandy up, but a violent mob surrounds their vehicle and beats Sandy to death. Carrie and Quinn narrowly escape.
38	2	"Trylon and Perisphere"	Keith Gordon	Chip Johannessen	October 5, 2014	4WAH02	1.61
Carrie and Quinn return to Washington; Lockhart recalls Carrie from her posting in Afghanistan as punishment for the botched airstrike. Carrie struggles to form a bond with her infant daughter Franny, who has been under the care of Carrie's sister Maggie in her absence. Quinn, meanwhile, lapses into alcoholism while coping with the events in Islamabad, for which he feels responsible. He has a sexual encounter with his landlady and is later arrested for beating two men at a restaurant. When Carrie bails him out, he gives her the name of Jordan Harris, a former Islamabad case officer who was removed from his posting despite an exemplary record. Carrie tracks down Harris and learns that Lockhart had him transferred out of Islamabad after Harris reported that Sandy was buying information using state secrets. Carrie uses this information to leverage Lockhart into placing her in charge of the Islamabad station, taking over for Sandy.
39	3	"Shalwar Kameez"	Lesli Linka Glatter	Alexander Cary	October 12, 2014	4WAH03	1.22
Carrie arrives in Islamabad as the new station chief and learns that the embassy has been placed on lockdown at the order of the U.S. ambassador, Martha Boyd. However, Carrie has set up an alternate base of operations with Fara and Max, aiming to establish contact with Aayan (who has been threatened to keep him from talking to the media). After Aayan refuses to speak with Fara, posing as a journalist, Carrie makes contact herself, saying she is Fara's boss, and offers Aayan protection as well as safe passage to London where he can continue his medical studies. Saul arrives in Islamabad with a security team from his company to back Carrie up; while there, he meets with Martha, who is an old friend and colleague, and offers Carrie further assistance. Meanwhile, Quinn submits his resignation to the CIA, but faces pressure to stay from Dar Adal, who goads Quinn with his failure to protect Sandy. While watching video footage of the mob's murder of Sandy, Quinn discovers evidence that the attack was premeditated and reports this to Carrie, who implores him to return to Pakistan. Quinn reluctantly agrees.
40	4	"Iron in the Fire"	Michael Offer	Patrick Harbinson	October 19, 2014	4WAH04	1.35
Aayan is told that he is being expelled from his university for stealing medicine. With nowhere else to go, he accepts Carrie's offer. Carrie receives confirmation from Aayan that the man who threatened him was ISI operative Farhad Ghazi, the same man Quinn identified as having coordinated the attack that led to Sandy's death. Carrie and her team begin surveillance on Ghazi, but he escapes. Dennis Boyd, the ambassador's husband, is approached by ISI agent Tasneem Qureishi, who has learned that Dennis was Sandy's secret source of U.S. intel. She uses this to blackmail him into becoming her informant. Fara follows Aayan and discovers that Haqqani – his uncle – is alive, not having died in the airstrike, and is receiving deliveries of medicine from Aayan. Carrie realizes that she can use Aayan to get to Haqqani. She installs Aayan at a safehouse, claiming that they must wait several days for his passport and visa, a ploy which buys her time to interrogate him and earn his trust. As part of her recruiting strategy, Carrie seduces Aayan.
41	5	"About a Boy"	Charlotte Sieling	Meredith Stiehm	October 26, 2014	4WAH05	1.52
Carrie interviews Aayan about his relationship with Haqqani, his uncle, but he panics when she broaches the rumor that Haqqani may be alive. On his way back to the United States, Saul spots Farhad Ghazi at the airport and calls Quinn to tell him that Ghazi is waiting for a flight to Johannesburg. Ghazi then gets out of the line and has two of his men kidnap Saul before revealing that he is working for Tasneem. Fara and Quinn, after failing to reach Carrie for assistance, follow a cleric who was seen with Haqqani, but are unable to proceed past a checkpoint, unaware that Saul is being transported in the trunk of the cleric's car. Dennis enters Carrie's quarters in the embassy seeking information about her. Quinn confronts Carrie over her having abandoned the mission to focus on recruiting Aayan, and accuses her of sexually exploiting the boy. Aayan confides in Carrie that Haqqani is alive.
42	6	"From A to B and Back Again"	Lesli Linka Glatter	Chip Johannessen	November 2, 2014	4WAH06	1.54
Carrie gives Aayan his new passport and rehearses him on the details of his identity. He and Carrie are attacked by several men at the safehouse, but Aayan is able to escape. The break-in is revealed to be a ruse engineered by Carrie to prompt Aayan to seek refuge with Haqqani. Dennis tracks down the safehouse and gives Tasneem evidence of Carrie's bipolar disorder, also reporting that Carrie has procured a new identity for Aayan. Quinn learns that Ghazi did not leave Islamabad and that Saul is unreachable. Carrie and deputy station chief John Redmond, together with Max, use a GPS tracker in Aayan's passport to monitor him as he travels to a rendezvous with Haqqani, following him with a CIA drone. However, Haqqani emerges with a captured Saul, aware that he is under watch, and executes Aayan for leading him into a trap. An enraged Carrie orders a drone strike even with Saul present at the site, but Quinn talks her down, allowing Haqqani and his men to leave with Saul in tow.
43	7	"Redux"	Carl Franklin	Alexander Cary	November 9, 2014	4WAH07	1.55
News of Saul's capture reaches the United States, prompting Lockhart to travel to Islamabad. With Saul's presence protecting him from an airstrike, Haqqani holds Saul captive at a compound near the Afghanistan border, where he plots to negotiate Saul's release in exchange for several prisoners. Dennis breaks into Carrie's apartment using a key given to him by Tasneem, and replaces her medication with a hallucinogenic substance. Carrie unwittingly takes the replacement drugs and begins suffering increasingly severe paranoid delusions while following one of Aayan's contacts. Carrie is soon taken off the streets by the police and delivered to a house where she has a vision of Nicholas Brody. Carrie breaks down crying in his arms, unaware that it is a hallucination and that she is actually in the presence of ISI colonel Aasar Khan.
44	8	"Halfway to a Donut"	Alex Graves	Chip Johannessen	November 16, 2014	4WAH08	1.66
Carrie awakens in Khan's house with no memory of how she got there. Tasneem tells Khan that the ISI was trying to have Carrie removed from Islamabad and that his intervention foiled their plan. Carrie surmises that her meds were tampered with, but Khan denies being involved. Over live video, Haqqani presents a captured Saul to the U.S. embassy and names the prisoners he wants released, but Saul begs the U.S. to refuse Haqqani's demands. Saul then escapes and is guided by Carrie and Quinn to a nearby CIA refuge. During a meeting between the U.S. embassy and the ISI about the prisoner exchange, Carrie realizes that the Pakistanis must already have Saul's location. Unable to extract Saul, Carrie reluctantly directs him back into the hands of the Taliban, refusing his wish to die rather than be recaptured. Lockhart decides that the U.S. will accept Haqqani's terms for the exchange. That night, Khan informs Carrie that Dennis Boyd is the ISI's mole in the embassy.
45	9	"There's Something Else Going On"	Seith Mann	Patrick Harbinson	November 23, 2014	4WAH09	1.77
Carrie has Dennis detained at the embassy with Martha's help. During the prisoner exchange, the Taliban use a young boy wearing a suicide vest as leverage to ensure the release of the five prisoners. Saul refuses to move, hoping to prevent the exchange from succeeding, but Carrie convinces him to get up. However, their convoy is struck by two RPGs on the way back to the embassy, prompting Lockhart to send the embassy's security forces to the scene. Dennis realizes that the security personnel are being diverted from an incoming attack on the embassy, and admits to Martha that he told Tasneem of the embassy's hidden underground entrance. As they speak, Haqqani and a troupe of armed men use the tunnel to enter the embassy.
46	10	"13 Hours in Islamabad"	Dan Attias	Alex Gansa & Howard Gordon	December 7, 2014	4WAH10	1.95
Carrie and Saul survive the assault on their convoy, but they and the troops sent to retrieve them are tied down by sniper fire. Haqqani and his men storm the embassy, slaughtering numerous employees. Lockhart, with a list of the CIA's assets in Pakistan, joins Martha, Dennis and a number of staff members in a secure room. Outside the door, Haqqani begins killing off survivors of the attack one by one, saying he will continue doing so until the list is handed over. When he gets to Fara and threatens to slit her throat, Lockhart relents and gives him the list, but Haqqani executes her nonetheless; Quinn and a Marine with him start shooting at Haqqani and his men, but a wounded Haqqani escapes with the list. The White House breaks off diplomatic relations with Pakistan and prepares to evacuate the remaining embassy staff; Quinn, however, goes rogue and kidnaps Farhad Ghazi in hopes of locating Haqqani. Lockhart gives Carrie permission to stay in Islamabad for five more days to find Quinn.
47	11	"Krieg Nicht Lieb"	Clark Johnson	Alexander Cary & Chip Johannessen	December 14, 2014	4WAH11	2.11
Quinn visits his former lover Astrid, a German intelligence officer stationed in Islamabad, and receives her help in locating Haqqani. While searching for Quinn, Carrie is devastated to learn from her sister that their father has died of a stroke. Quinn has Aayan's ex-girlfriend upload a video of Aayan's execution to the internet, intending to prompt public protests and draw Haqqani out of hiding, and he assembles a bomb he plans to detonate during the demonstration. Tasneem sends a group of pro-Haqqani counter-protesters to the demonstration. Carrie prevents Quinn from detonating the bomb, but moves in to kill Haqqani herself when he shows himself to greet his supporters. However, Khan prevents her from shooting Haqqani, alerting her to Dar Adal's presence in Haqqani's vehicle.
48	12	"Long Time Coming"	Lesli Linka Glatter	Meredith Stiehm	December 21, 2014	4WAH12	1.92
Dar Adal informs Saul that he made a deal with Haqqani, who agreed not to harbor terrorists in Afghanistan in exchange for being removed from the CIA's kill list. Dar assures Saul that the video evidence of his capture by Haqqani will not be publicized, preserving Saul's chances of becoming CIA director. Carrie returns home from Islamabad for her father's funeral. She and Quinn reunite and share a kiss later that night; Quinn suggests to Carrie that they leave the CIA together, but Carrie believes she is incapable of upholding a relationship. Carrie tracks down her estranged mother, who apologizes for abandoning her family and assures Carrie that her bipolar disorder does not prevent her from having a healthy relationship. Carrie attempts to call Quinn, but he has already accepted a high-risk mission in Syria with Dar's group, believing Carrie turned him down. Carrie visits Dar Adal and confronts him over his dealings with Haqqani, claiming that Saul would never approve; however, she is dismayed to find Saul already at Dar's house, and realizes that he in fact agreed to the deal.

== Production ==
On October 22, 2013, Homeland was renewed for a fourth season, consisting of 12 episodes. Production and filming for the fourth season began in June 2014, shifting production to Cape Town, South Africa. Executive producers for the fourth season are Alex Gansa, Howard Gordon, Gideon Raff, Alexander Cary, Chip Johannessen, Meredith Stiehm, Avi Nir, and Ran Telem.

=== Casting ===
Nazanin Boniadi, who had a recurring role in the third season as Fara Sherazi, was promoted to series regular for the fourth season. Several actors were cast for the fourth season in June 2014, including new series regular Laila Robins, as well as Corey Stoll, Suraj Sharma, Raza Jaffrey, and Michael O'Keefe, who all have recurring roles. In July 2014, Nimrat Kaur, Mark Moses and Art Malik were additionally cast in recurring roles.

== Reception ==
=== Critical response ===
The fourth season received positive reviews from critics, with particular acclaim for the second half. On Metacritic, it has a score of 74 out of 100, based on 22 reviews. On Rotten Tomatoes, the season received an 82% rating based on 49 reviews with an average rating of 8.0/10. The critical consensus reads "Homeland is back on top, with a renewed energy and focus not seen since its first season." Verne Gay of Newsday gave the season premiere an "A+" grade and wrote that the show "feels as fresh, important and relevant as yesterday's news – or tomorrow's news. A bracing, intelligent start." Matthew Gilbert of The Boston Globe noted it has improved over its previous seasons, and wrote, "The rebooted Homeland promises to be an engaging, streamlined CIA thriller with a few big ideas about America and the war on terrorism." Mary McNamara of the Los Angeles Times also noted the series improvement and wrote, "Early episodes are strong, if not as shattering as the inaugural season." The season finale was well-received, with Rotten Tomatoes giving the episode a 100% rating based on 12 critic reviews, saying "Subverting expectations, "Long Time Coming" makes for a smart, sharp, and satisfyingly subdued finale for an excellent season of Homeland."

=== Accolades ===
For the 21st Screen Actors Guild Awards, the cast was nominated for Best Drama Ensemble, Claire Danes was nominated for Best Drama Actress, and the series was nominated for Best Stunt Team. For the 72nd Golden Globe Awards, Danes was nominated for Best Actress – Television Series Drama. For the 67th Directors Guild of America Awards, Lesli Linka Glatter won for Outstanding Directing – Drama Series for the episode "From A to B and Back Again", and Dan Attias received a nomination in the same category for directing "13 Hours in Islamabad". For the 5th Critics' Choice Television Awards, the series was nominated for Best Drama Series and Mandy Patinkin was nominated for Best Supporting Actor in a Drama Series.

For the 67th Primetime Emmy Awards, the series received five nominations, including Outstanding Drama Series, Claire Danes for Outstanding Lead Actress in a Drama Series, F. Murray Abraham for Outstanding Guest Actor in a Drama Series, and Lesli Linka Glatter for Outstanding Directing for a Drama Series for "From A to B and Back Again".

=== Criticisms ===
Laura Durkay of The Washington Post criticized the show for perpetuating cultural stereotypes and Islamophobia.

According to media reports, Pakistani officials were unhappy over the depiction of Pakistan in the fourth season. Nadeem Hotiana, spokesperson of Pakistan Embassy, said, "Maligning a country that has been a close partner and ally of the US is a disservice not only to the security interests of the US, but also to the people of the US." A source was quoted as saying, "Islamabad is a quiet, picturesque city with beautiful mountains and lush greenery. In Homeland, it’s portrayed as a grimy hellhole and war zone where shootouts and bombs go off with dead bodies scattered around. Nothing is further from the truth." The alleged Islamabad scenes were filmed in Cape Town, South Africa. The officials also lashed out at "absurd" portrayal of terrorist treatment in Pakistan, saying, "Repeated insinuations that an intelligence agency of Pakistan is complicit in protecting the terrorists at the expense of innocent Pakistani civilians is not only absurd but also an insult to the ultimate sacrifices of the thousands of Pakistani security personnel in the war against terrorism."
