= 13 Hours in Islamabad =

- Homeland episode
- Episode no.: Season 4 Episode 10
- Directed by: Dan Attias
- Written by: Alex Gansa; Howard Gordon
- Production code: 4WAH10
- Original air date: December 7, 2014
- Running time: 45 minutes

Guest appearances
- Numan Acar as Haissam Haqqani; Mark Moses as Dennis Boyd; Nimrat Kaur as Tasneem Qureishi; Raza Jaffrey as Aasar Khan; Maury Sterling as Max; Michael O'Keefe as John Redmond

Episode chronology
← Previous "There's Something Else Going On"	Next → "Krieg Nicht Lieb"
- Homeland season 4

"13 Hours in Islamabad" is the tenth episode of the fourth season of the American television drama series Homeland, and the 46th episode overall. It premiered on Showtime on December 7, 2014.

== Plot ==
Carrie (Claire Danes) and Saul (Mandy Patinkin) are pulled from the damaged van by the Marines, but John Redmond (Michael O'Keefe) did not survive. Quinn (Rupert Friend) uses the radio to ask the Marines to return, but Taliban soldiers shoot from nearby buildings, pinning them down. Martha (Laila Robins), Dennis (Mark Moses), and Lockhart (Tracy Letts) hide in the vault, a secure lockdown room, with a package containing the names of all CIA informants in Pakistan. Haissam Haqqani (Numan Acar) and his Taliban soldiers arrive. They gun down many embassy personnel and keep the survivors as hostages.

As Marines are hit around Carrie, she phones Col. Aasar Khan (Raza Jaffrey), asking him to send the Pakistani military. However, Tasneem Qureishi (Nimrat Kaur) reveals that the ISI is helping the Taliban, to Khan's disapproval. Tasneem tells Khan to delay the soldiers by 10 minutes.

Quinn and a Marine succeed in killing some of the Taliban. Haqqani goes to the vault and demands it be opened and demands the package of informants. He executes several embassy personnel. Against Martha's wishes, Lockhart yields and opens the vault. The package is handed over. However, Haqqani executes Fara Sherazi (Nazanin Boniadi) regardless. Before he can execute the others, Quinn and the Marine open fire on the group; Haqqani is wounded but escapes. Carrie, Saul, and the bodies of Marines are brought back to the embassy by the Pakistani military.

The White House cuts relations with Pakistan and prepares to evacuate the surviving embassy personnel. Dennis asks Martha for a belt to commit suicide with, in order to lower the impact on Martha's career, but he changes his mind. Max grieves over Fara's death. Quinn decides to take matters into his own hands. He abducts Farhad Ghazi, the ISI agent who kidnapped Saul, and prepares to torture him in a warehouse. Carrie is given permission to stay behind for five more days, in order to find Quinn and bring him home.

== Production ==
The episode was directed by Dan Attias and written by series co-creators Alex Gansa and Howard Gordon.

== Reception ==
=== Ratings ===
The original broadcast of the episode was watched by 1.95 million viewers, an increase of over 200,000 from the previous episode.

=== Critical response ===
"13 Hours in Islamabad" received critical acclaim. The review aggregator website Rotten Tomatoes reported a 100% approval rating from critics based on 13 reviews. The website's consensus reads, "Homeland continues to impress this season, as "13 Hours in Islamabad" is a tense, action-packed installment that features outstanding performances and some shocking plot turns."

Joshua Alston of The A.V. Club graded the episode an "A−", stating "'13 Hours In Islamabad' is the liveliest, most startling, and emotionally bruising episode in the show's post-Brody phase." IGN writer Scott Collura gave the episode a high score of 9 out of 10 (signifying "amazing") and wrote "Homeland continues to thrill this season with another tense episode that killed off a couple of well-liked supporting characters while also taking others to gratifying new places."

A former intelligence expert noted numerous issues with the behaviour of characters in the episode, noting the real-life training that embassy staff and CIA officers receive which is designed to prevent some of the scenarios depicted in the episode.

=== Accolades ===
For this episode, Dan Attias was nominated for the Directors Guild of America Award for Outstanding Directing – Drama Series.
