= From A to B and Back Again =

- Homeland episode
- Episode no.: Season 4 Episode 6
- Directed by: Lesli Linka Glatter
- Written by: Chip Johannessen
- Production code: 4WAH06
- Original air date: November 2, 2014
- Running time: 48 minutes

Guest appearances
- Suraj Sharma as Aayan Ibrahim; Michael O'Keefe as John Redmond; Mark Moses as Dennis Boyd; Maury Sterling as Max; Numan Acar as Haissam Haqqani; Nimrat Kaur as Tasneem Qureishi; Shavani Seth as Kiran

Episode chronology
← Previous "About a Boy"	Next → "Redux"
- Homeland season 4

"From A to B and Back Again" is the sixth episode of the fourth season of the American television drama series Homeland, and the 42nd episode overall. It premiered on Showtime on November 2, 2014.

== Plot ==
At the safehouse, Carrie (Claire Danes) presents Aayan (Suraj Sharma) with his new identity and passport, and tells him of the plan to depart for London that night. Aayan makes one last visit to his dormitory to retrieve some personal effects, but notices a man following him as he leaves. Thinking he has shaken the tail, he returns to the safehouse, but the same man, along with two associates, soon break into the safehouse and go after Aayan. Aayan is able to escape, and watches as Carrie is forcefully thrown into a van and taken away. The kidnapping is revealed to be a ruse concocted by Carrie, with the intent of getting Aayan to seek refuge with his uncle, Haissam Haqqani (Numan Acar). Via a tracker that was hidden by Max in his passport, Aayan is located by a drone which relays a visual of his whereabouts to the operations room where Carrie, Quinn (Rupert Friend), and Redmond (Michael O'Keefe) observe.

Quinn learns from colleague Alan Hensleigh that Farhad Ghazi wasn't on the plane that landed in Johannesburg, and that all attempts to contact Saul have failed.

Dennis Boyd (Mark Moses) reports his findings to Tasneem Qureishi (Nimrat Kaur). Following Fara (Nazanin Boniadi) from the Embassy, Dennis learned the location of the safehouse and found Aayan's personal photos inside. He also gives Tasneem the photos of Carrie's medications, surmising that Carrie is "at least bipolar, possibly beyond that".

After calling his uncle, Aayan goes to a secluded location where he is met by a convoy of vehicles containing heavily armed men. Carrie confirms to the drone shooter that if the presence of Haqqani is confirmed, they will fire on the target even though the asset, Aayan, will surely be killed as well. Haqqani emerges from one of the vehicles, but to the shock of those in the operations room, he also has brought Saul Berenson (Mandy Patinkin) as a hostage. Haqqani tells Aayan that his "friend" has led them into a trap and that there is a drone waiting above to kill them. Haqqani thanks Aayan for the medicines and kisses him, then shoots him in the head, killing him instantly. An increasingly enraged Carrie gives the order to the drone shooter to take the shot anyway. She is talked down by Quinn, and storms out of the operations room as Haqqani and his men drive away with Saul.

== Production ==
The episode was directed by executive producer Lesli Linka Glatter and written by executive producer Chip Johannessen.

== Reception ==
=== Critical response ===
The episode received very positive reviews from critics. Alyssa Rosenberg of The Washington Post said "Homeland just aired its best episode in years" and that the episode "explored the benefits and dreadful potential costs of Carrie’s approach to her job with a clarity that is both terrible and terribly exciting". Price Peterson of New York magazine gave the episode 5 out of 5 stars, calling it "one of Homeland's finest episodes to date", and also highlighting how it investigated Carrie's priorities. Ben Travers of IndieWire gave the episode an 'A' grade on the strength of its fast pace and plot twists.

Claire Danes was named "Performer of the Week" by TVLine for her performance.

=== Ratings ===
The original broadcast of the episode was watched by 1.54 million viewers, which was roughly equal with the previous episode.

== Accolades ==
For this episode, Lesli Linka Glatter won the Directors Guild of America Award for Outstanding Directing – Drama Series, and was nominated for Outstanding Directing for a Drama series at the 67th Primetime Emmy Awards. Claire Danes was also nominated for a Primetime Emmy Award for Outstanding Lead Actress in a Drama Series at the 67th Primetime Emmy Awards, having submitted this episode.
