= Long Time Coming (Homeland) =

- Homeland episode
- Episode no.: Season 4 Episode 12
- Directed by: Lesli Linka Glatter
- Written by: Meredith Stiehm
- Production code: 4WAH12
- Original air date: December 21, 2014
- Running time: 54 minutes

Guest appearances
- Victoria Clark as Ellen Mathison; Amy Hargreaves as Maggie Mathison; Sarita Choudhury as Mira Berenson; Nimrat Kaur as Tasneem Qureishi; John Getz as Joe Crocker; Mike McColl as Rob; F. Murray Abraham as Dar Adal

Episode chronology
← Previous "Krieg Nicht Lieb"	Next → "Separation Anxiety"
- Homeland season 4

"Long Time Coming" is the fourth season finale of the American television drama series Homeland, and the 48th episode overall. It premiered on Showtime on December 21, 2014.

== Plot ==
With Lockhart's resignation as director imminent over the downbeat events in Pakistan, Saul (Mandy Patinkin) explores avenues back into the CIA, possibly as director. A potential obstacle is the video Haissam Haqqani recorded with Saul as a hostage, which, if publicized, would make Saul damaged goods politically.

Dar Adal (F. Murray Abraham) informs Saul that he made a deal with Haqqani. In exchange for Haqqani agreeing to no longer harbor terrorists in Afghanistan, the CIA took Haqqani off their "kill list". Saul is offended that such a deal was made and that Haqqani cannot be trusted to keep his word. Adal presents a memory card containing the video, given to him by Haqqani, with the assurance that Saul no longer needs to worry about it surfacing. He invites Saul to come back and lead the CIA.

After their father's death, Carrie (Claire Danes) and Maggie (Amy Hargreaves) receive a surprise visit from Ellen Mathison (Victoria Clark), their mother who has been absent for 15 years. Carrie is hostile to her and kicks her out of the house immediately.

Carrie leads a eulogy for her father Frank at the funeral. There, she is reunited with Quinn (Rupert Friend), who managed to get out of Pakistan with the help of German Intelligence. After a post-funeral reception, Carrie and Quinn share a passionate kiss. Carrie backs off and warns that any relationship with her can only end badly. Quinn says he wants to leave the CIA but won't be able to stay out without her help; he asks her to think about it and leaves.

Quinn is approached by an associate, Rob (Mike McColl), who presents him with a new assignment: the assassination of three high-value IS (ISIL) targets in Aleppo, Syria. Quinn refuses the assignment, saying that he is quitting. Rob claims that the mission is 20% less likely to be successful without him, and tries to manipulate him into it by having him send the other associates' letters to their loved ones, in case the mission goes badly, but Quinn eventually refuses. After a phone call with Carrie, Quinn assumes that she is going to refuse his proposal. He accepts the mission just as the assassination team is about to leave, after having written his own letter, addressed to Carrie.

Carrie has second thoughts and tracks down Ellen, wanting answers for why she abandoned the family. Ellen confesses that she was a habitual adulterer, and after she became pregnant from another man, she decided to cut ties with the Mathisons. Carrie is taken aback by this, having always had the belief that her father's bipolar condition was what made their marriage untenable.

Carrie tries to call Quinn but only finds that his number is out of service, after which she visits Adal, demanding to be put in contact with Quinn, but Adal says that Quinn has gone on the mission in Syria and cannot be reached. Carrie confronts Adal with the knowledge that he met Haqqani in Islamabad. She asserts that Saul would never endorse a deal with Haqqani which would dishonor all of their fallen allies at the embassy. Adal tells her to ask Saul herself, revealing that Saul is outside on the deck. Carrie looks at Saul, realizing that he did agree to the deal, and leaves without saying a word to him.

== Production ==
The episode was directed by executive producer Lesli Linka Glatter and written by executive producer Meredith Stiehm.

== Reception ==
=== Critical response ===
The review aggregator website Rotten Tomatoes reported a 100% approval rating from critics based on 12 reviews. The website's consensus reads, "Subverting expectations, "Long Time Coming" makes for a smart, sharp, and satisfyingly subdued finale for an excellent season of Homeland."

Cory Barker of TV.com said the finale "offered a really strong mix of somber reflection and intrigue for the future", adding that Meredith Stiehm's script was "particularly well-constructed".

Joshua Alston of The A.V. Club gave a "B−" grade, saying that the episode had problems with its pacing, while also observing there was "a genuine thoughtfulness lent to this episode".

IGN's Scott Collura rated the episode a 9.0 out of 10, and wrote "Season 4 ended on a quiet, reflective cliffhanger, a nice change of pace for the series".

=== Accolades ===
F. Murray Abraham was nominated for the Primetime Emmy Award for Outstanding Guest Actor in a Drama Series for this episode.

=== Ratings ===
The original broadcast was watched by 1.92 million viewers.
