= Trylon and Perisphere (Homeland) =

- Homeland episode
- Episode no.: Season 4 Episode 2
- Directed by: Keith Gordon
- Written by: Chip Johannessen
- Production code: 4WAH02
- Original air date: October 5, 2014
- Running time: 49 minutes

Guest appearances
- Suraj Sharma as Aayan Ibrahim; Amy Hargreaves as Maggie Mathison; Adam Godley as Jordan Harris; Akshay Kumar as Rahim; Shavani Seth as Kiran; F. Murray Abraham as Dar Adal

Episode chronology
← Previous "The Drone Queen"	Next → "Shalwar Kameez"
- Homeland season 4

"Trylon and Perisphere" is the second episode of the fourth season of the American television drama series Homeland and the 38th episode overall. It premiered on Showtime on October 5, 2014, airing back-to-back with the season's first episode, "The Drone Queen."

== Plot ==
Carrie (Claire Danes) and Quinn (Rupert Friend) return to Washington. Lockhart (Tracy Letts) tells Carrie that she is being permanently recalled from her position as Afghanistan's station chief as a result of the botched airstrike. Carrie goes to see her sister Maggie (Amy Hargreaves), who has been caring for Carrie's daughter Frannie in her absence. Maggie encourages Carrie to bond with Frannie, but Carrie is clearly uncomfortable and interacts with the baby as little as possible. Carrie is left alone with her daughter the next day. She does her best to care for Frannie but also confesses to the baby that with Brody dead, she can't remember why she gave birth to her. Later, while giving her a bath, Carrie loses her grip on Frannie, who is momentarily submerged. Carrie then holds Frannie's head dangerously close to the water for several seconds before hurriedly yanking her out of the bathtub.

Quinn struggles to cope with recent events. He gets very drunk by the pool at his apartment complex and is confronted by the landlady Eden (Emily Walker) with whom he ends up having sex. When they have breakfast at a diner the next morning, some customers make fat jokes at the woman's expense. Quinn violently attacks them in retaliation and is arrested. When Carrie bails him out, Quinn gives her the name of Jordan Harris (Adam Godley), a case officer in Islamabad who was transferred away, in spite of an exemplary record. Carrie finds Harris working as a CIA librarian, and Harris confides that Lockhart sidelined him after he reported that Sandy Bachman was buying information with state secrets. Carrie confronts Lockhart with this information, accusing him of being an accomplice to Bachman. Now with significant leverage, Carrie demands and is granted the station chief position in Pakistan that Bachman left behind.

Aayan Ibrahim (Suraj Sharma), who has been getting attention from the media, is attacked in his sleep by an unknown man, who commands him not to speak with the press anymore.

Carrie returns to Maggie to deliver the news of her reassignment. Maggie accuses Carrie of manipulating the situation at work to avoid having to raise her daughter. Carrie can only muster saying "I'm so sorry" to Frannie before walking away.

=== Trivia ===
Emily Walker is a writer and actress who portrayed Eden on Homeland. Although her name is mentioned onscreen she is credited as 'Landlady' in the end credits.

== Production ==
The episode was directed by Keith Gordon and written by executive producer Chip Johannessen.

== Title ==
The title reflects the two modernistic structures—Trylon and Perisphere, together known as the "Theme Center"—at the center of the New York World's Fair of 1939–1940.

== Reception ==
=== Ratings ===
The two-hour premiere was watched by 1.61 million viewers, decreasing in viewership from the season three finale which had a series-high viewership of 2.38 million viewers.
