= 67th Directors Guild of America Awards =

- Date: February 7, 2015
- Location: Hyatt Regency Century Plaza, Los Angeles, California
- Country: United States
- Presented by: Directors Guild of America
- Hosted by: Jane Lynch

Highlights
- Best Director Feature Film: Birdman or (The Unexpected Virtue of Ignorance) – Alejandro G. Iñárritu
- Best Director Documentary: Citizenfour – Laura Poitras
- Website: https://www.dga.org/Awards/History/2010s/2014.aspx?value=2014

The 67th Directors Guild of America Awards, honoring the outstanding directorial achievements in films, documentary and television in 2014, were presented on February 7, 2015, at the Hyatt Regency Century Plaza. The ceremony was hosted by Jane Lynch for the second time. The nominees for the feature film category were announced on January 13, 2015 and the nominations for directing achievements in television, documentaries and commercials were announced on January 14, 2015.

== Winners and nominees ==
=== Film ===
Feature Film

Alejandro G. Iñárritu – Birdman or (The Unexpected Virtue of Ignorance)

- Wes Anderson – The Grand Budapest Hotel
- Clint Eastwood – American Sniper
- Richard Linklater – Boyhood
- Morten Tyldum – The Imitation Game
Documentaries

Laura Poitras – Citizenfour

- Dan Krauss – The Kill Team
- John Maloof and Charlie Siskel – Finding Vivian Maier
- Jesse Moss – The Overnighters
- Orlando von Einsiedel – Virunga

=== Television ===
Drama Series

Lesli Linka Glatter – Homeland for "From A to B and Back Again"

- Dan Attias – Homeland for "13 Hours in Islamabad"
- Jodie Foster – House of Cards for "Chapter 22"
- Cary Joji Fukunaga – True Detective for "Who Goes There"
- Alex Graves – Game of Thrones for "The Children"
Comedy Series

Joey Soloway – Transparent for "Best New Girl"

- Louis C.K. – Louie for "Elevator, Part 6"
- Jodie Foster – Orange Is the New Black for "Thirsty Bird"
- Mike Judge – Silicon Valley for "Minimum Viable Product"
- Gail Mancuso – Modern Family for "Las Vegas"
Miniseries or TV Film

Lisa Cholodenko – Olive Kitteridge

- Rob Ashford and Glenn Weiss – Peter Pan Live!
- Uli Edel – Houdini
- Ryan Murphy – The Normal Heart
- Michael Wilson – The Trip to Bountiful
Variety/Talk/News/Sports – Regularly Scheduled Programming

Dave Diomedi – The Tonight Show Starring Jimmy Fallon for "Episode #1"

- Paul G. Casey – Real Time with Bill Maher for "#1226"
- Jim Hoskinson – The Colbert Report for "#11040"
- Don Roy King – Saturday Night Live for "Host Jim Carrey/Musical Guest Iggy Azalea"
- Chuck O'Neil – The Daily Show with John Stewart for "Open-Carrying to the Midterms"
Variety/Talk/News/Sports – Specials

Glenn Weiss – The 68th Annual Tony Awards

- Hamish Hamilton – The 86th Annual Academy Awards
- Louis J. Horvitz – The 37th Annual Kennedy Center Honors
- Des McAnuff – Billy Crystal: 700 Sundays
- Rich Russo – Super Bowl XLVIII
Reality Programs

Anthony B. Sacco – The Chair for "The Test"

- Bertram van Munster, Jack Cannon, and Elise Doganieri – The Quest for "One True Hero"
- Neil DeGroot – The Biggest Loser for "Episode 1613"
- Steve Hryniewicz – Top Chef for "The First Thanksgiving"
- Adam Vetri – Steve Austin's Broken Skull Challenge for "Welcome to the Gun Show"
Children's Programs

Jonathan Judge – 100 Things to Do Before High School for "Pilot"

- Paul Hoen – How to Build a Better Boy
- Vince Marcello – An American Girl: Isabelle Dances Into the Spotlight
- Joey Mazzarino – Sesame Street for "4504 Numericon"
- Amy Schatz – Saving My Tomorrow for "Part 1" and "Part 2"

=== Commercials ===
Commercials

Nicolai Fuglsig – Guinness' "Sapeurs" and FEMA's "Waiting"

- Lauren Greenfield – Always' "Always #LikeAGirl"
- Brendan Malloy and Emmett Malloy – Nike's "The Huddle"
- Daniel Mercadante and Katina Hubbard – Dick's Sporting Goods' "Sports Matter" and Facebook's "We Are Not Alone" and "Big Sister"
- Noam Murro – Dodge's "Ahead of Their Time" and Guinness' "Empty Chair"

=== Lifetime Achievement in Television ===
- James Burrows
- Robert Butler

=== Frank Capra Achievement Award ===
- Phillip M. Goldfarb

=== Franklin J. Schaffner Achievement Award ===
- Julie E. Gelfand
