= The Drone Queen =

- Homeland episode
- Episode no.: Season 4 Episode 1
- Directed by: Lesli Linka Glatter
- Written by: Alex Gansa
- Production code: 4WAH01
- Original air date: October 5, 2014
- Running time: 49 minutes

Guest appearances
- Suraj Sharma as Aayan Ibrahim; Bradley James as J.G. Edgars; Amy Hargreaves as Maggie Mathison; Sarita Choudhury as Mira Berenson; Alex Lanipekun as Hank Wonham; Patrick St. Esprit as Aaron; Akshay Kumar as Rahim; Shavani Seth as Kiran; Corey Stoll as Sandy Bachman

Episode chronology
← Previous "The Star"	Next → "Trylon and Perisphere"
- Homeland season 4

"The Drone Queen" is the first episode of the fourth season of the American television drama series Homeland and the 37th episode overall. It premiered on Showtime on October 5, 2014, airing back-to-back with the season's second episode, "Trylon and Perisphere."

== Plot ==
Carrie (Claire Danes), now the CIA station chief in Afghanistan, receives intelligence from Islamabad, Pakistan station chief Sandy Bachman (Corey Stoll), giving her a farmhouse in Pakistan as the current location of Haissam Haqqani, a highly sought terrorist. Sandy refuses to name his source but stresses that it is the same one as the last four high-priority kills. Carrie authorizes the air strike, and it successfully destroys the farmhouse. Afterwards, her staff presents her with a birthday cake upon which she is proclaimed "The Drone Queen".

Reports emerge from Pakistan that Haqqani was attending a wedding when the air strike hit, resulting in the deaths of Haqqani along with 40 civilians. The US publicly denies the reports. Aayan Ibrahim (Suraj Sharma), a student who was injured in the explosion, wakes up to find that his mother and sister were among those who perished.

Aayan realizes that he had been recording a video of the wedding party on his phone at the moment the missiles struck. Aayan declines to upload the video to YouTube despite the urging of his roommate Rahim (Akshay Kumar). While Aayan sleeps, Rahim takes the phone and gets his cousin to upload the video, and it quickly goes viral. Carrie receives the news of the video from CIA Director Lockhart (Tracy Letts), who informs her that the President is furious and that the Pakistan Armed Forces are demanding an explanation. Carrie is dispatched to Islamabad to meet with Sandy and US Ambassador to Pakistan Martha Boyd (Laila Robins). Aayan worries about the repercussions once the video is traced back to him.

Shortly before Carrie's arrival, Sandy leaves the embassy with no protection so he can meet with his secret source. When he gets to the door of the meeting place, he finds that his key no longer works.

Meanwhile, Peter Quinn (Rupert Friend), now working at the Pakistan station, picks up Carrie at the airport. While there, they discover that Sandy's name and picture have been leaked to the Pakistan press and are being shown on the television channels, revealing him as the man behind the airstrike. They inform Sandy and race to pick him up, but when Sandy gets into their van, an angry mob surrounds them and smashes the windows. They pull Sandy out and beat him to death. Quinn and Carrie are able to maneuver the van out of the mob and escape with their lives.

== Production ==
The episode was directed by executive producer Lesli Linka Glatter and written by showrunner Alex Gansa.

== Reception ==
=== Critical response ===
The episode was received positively by critics, judging it to be a satisfactory reboot after the events of the third season. IGN's Scott Collura rated the episode 8.9 out of 10, saying that "Homeland feels reenergized and vital again." Matt Brennan of Slant Magazine described the episode as "focused and remarkably temperate, establishing the state of play for a new threat with precise, unfettered strokes."

=== Ratings ===
The premiere was watched by 1.61 million viewers, decreasing in viewership from the season three finale, which had a series-high viewership of 2.38 million viewers.
