= Raza Jaffrey =

British actor

- Born: 28 May 1975 (age 51)
- Education: University of Manchester (BA); Bristol Old Vic Theatre School (GrDip)
- Occupation: Actor
- Spouses: Miranda Raison (m. 2007; div. 2009) Lara Pulver (m. 2014)
- Children: 2

Raza Jaffrey (28 May 1975) is a British actor known for his roles as Zafar Younis in the BBC One spy drama series Spooks (2004–2007) and Neal Hudson in the CBS medical drama Code Black (2015). He also had a recurring role as Aasar Khan in season 4 of the Showtime series Homeland (2014). More recently, he appeared in the NBC series The Enemy Within (2019) and the Starz series The Serpent Queen (2022–2024).

== Early life and education ==
Jaffrey's father, Hyder Jaffrey, was born in Agra, India, and later moved to Pakistan after Partition. Hyder Jaffrey emigrated to the UK in 1948 to train in the merchant navy and later became a captain. Hyder met Joan Bradshaw, an Irish Catholic Liverpudlian, in the early 1950s and they lived in Karachi, Pakistan, for a decade. The couple married in 1962 and had four children, of whom Raza was the youngest.

Jaffrey grew up in London and was educated at Dulwich College between 1986 and 1991, alongside actors Rupert Penry-Jones and Chiwetel Ejiofor.

Jaffrey's initial career aspiration was to become a Royal Air Force pilot and he passed the entrance exams for it and went on to study English and Drama at Manchester University with the intention of gaining a degree to join officer training. However while at university, he became interested in acting and joined the Bristol Old Vic Theatre School after graduation.

While at university, Jaffrey appeared in several plays at the Edinburgh Festival Fringe, including The London Vertigo by Brian Friel, and at the Pendley Open Air Shakespeare Festival, including Henry VIII and A Comedy of Errors. In his final year at Manchester, he worked with Royal Shakespeare Company chief associate director Gregory Doran, which he has cited as one of the things that led him to apply for Bristol Old Vic Theatre School and eventually go on to become a professional actor. Throughout his time at Manchester, he was also the lead singer of a jazz funk band. He also participated on America's Next Top Model.

== Career ==
Jaffrey has worked extensively on stage, appearing in Romeo and Juliet (Haymarket Theatre), Cyrano De Bergerac (Theatre Royal), East Is East (Oldham Coliseum), and 14 Songs, 2 Weddings, and a Funeral (Lyric Hammersmith, Birmingham Repertory Theatre). His break came in 2001 when he was cast as Sky in Mamma Mia! at the Prince Edward Theatre, London, directed by Phyllida Lloyd. From this, he went on to land the leading role in Andrew Lloyd Webber's production of A. R. Rahman's Bombay Dreams at the Apollo Theatre, London, directed by Steven Pimlott. He won rave reviews for his performance, with the BBC hailing him as "the most exciting new leading man to emerge in a London musical since Hugh Jackman became an overnight star in the National Theatre production of Oklahoma".

After leaving Bombay Dreams he appeared in ITV1's M.I.T.: Murder Investigation Team, the HBO/BBC co-production Dirty War, and the three-part BBC drama Life Isn't All Ha Ha Hee Hee. In 2005, he began work on the BBC One spy drama series Spooks as agent Zafar Younis. During that time, he returned to the stage, playing Orsino in Shakespeare's Twelfth Night at the Albery Theatre, London, and was cast in the David Cronenberg film Eastern Promises.

Jaffrey left Spooks to join the BBC One drama series Mistresses and went on to star in Sharpe's Peril and the films Infinite Justice, for which he won the Best Supporting Actor Award at the Kara Film Festival, The Crew, and Harry Brown. In 2010, he appeared in Sex and the City 2 as Gaurav. He then went on to star as cheating boyfriend Mike in the BBC1 comedy Accidental Farmer.

In 2011, he appeared as the French supervillain Cain on the NBC superhero drama The Cape before working for NBC again on the Steven Spielberg–produced drama Smash, airing in early 2012. In Smash, he played Dev, the English boyfriend of a rising Broadway star, working as a press officer in the New York Mayor's office. He did not return to the show for its second season. In 2019, Jaffrey played Ottoman Janissary Captain Sunal Demir in the historical romance drama film, Cliffs of Freedom.

Jaffrey still continues to sing and has performed in several concert productions, including singing at the London Palladium with the Royal Philharmonic Orchestra, and with the BBC Concert Orchestra for BBC Radio 2. He was also the creator and co-producer of the dance show RED, a celebration of dozens of styles of movement and dance, brought together by their influences on and from India. He took the show to Johannesburg's Nelson Mandela Theatre. He played the role of Billy Flynn in Chicago at the Garrick Theatre in London.

== Personal life ==
Jaffrey married actress Miranda Raison in 2007. They divorced two years later. In 2012, Jaffrey began a relationship with actress Lara Pulver. The couple married two years later. The couple has a son and daughter.

== Filmography ==
=== Film ===
Year	Title	Role
2004	Dirty War	Rashid Dhar
2006	Infinite Justice	Kamal Khan
2007	Eastern Promises	Doctor Aziz
2008	The Crew	Keith Thompson
2009	Harry Brown	Father Bracken
2010	Sex and the City 2	Butler Gaurau
2016	The Rendezvous	Jake Al-Shadi
2019	Cliffs of Freedom	Sunal Demir
2020	The Rhythm Section	Proctor
2021	Sweet Girl	Vinod Shah
2025	Goodbye June	Dr. Simon Khal

=== Television ===
Year	Title	Role	Notes
1998	Picking Up the Pieces	Frank	
1999	EastEnders	Mr Datani	
2002	Casualty	Hakkan Tahsin	
2004–2007	Spooks	Zafar Younis	23 episodes
2005	Murder Investigation Team	Kareem Dobar	Episode: "Phone Tag"
2005	Life Isn't All Ha Ha Hee Hee	Krishan	
2008	Sharpe's Peril	Lance Naik Singh	
2008–2009	Mistresses	Hari	12 episodes
2011	The Cape	Cain / Raimonde LeFleur	Episode: "Tarot"
2012	Smash	Dev Sundaram	Season 1
2014	Death in Paradise	Adam Frost	Series 3: Episode 4
2014	Once Upon a Time in Wonderland	Taj	3 episodes
2014	Law & Order: Special Victims Unit	Defense Lawyer	Episode: "Spring Awakening"
2014–2015	Elementary	Andrew Mittal	4 episodes; Recurring role
2014	Homeland	Aasar Khan	7 episodes; Recurring role
2015	Code Black	Neal Hudson	Main role
2017	Adventure Time	Danny	Episode: "Ring of Fire"
2018–2021	Lost in Space	Victor Dhar	Recurring role (15 episodes)
2019	The Enemy Within	Daniel Zain	Main role
2022–2024	The Serpent Queen	Francis, Duke of Guise	Main role
2022	Pantheon	Vinod Chanda (voice)	8 episodes
2023	Maternal	Jack Oliviera	ITV drama
2025	Malice	Damien	Amazon Prime
2026–present	The Agency	Craig	Recurring role; 9 episodes

=== Radio ===
Year	Title	Role	Notes
2008	Double Science	Danny Woods, Anish	
