= Mark Moses =

American actor (born 1958)

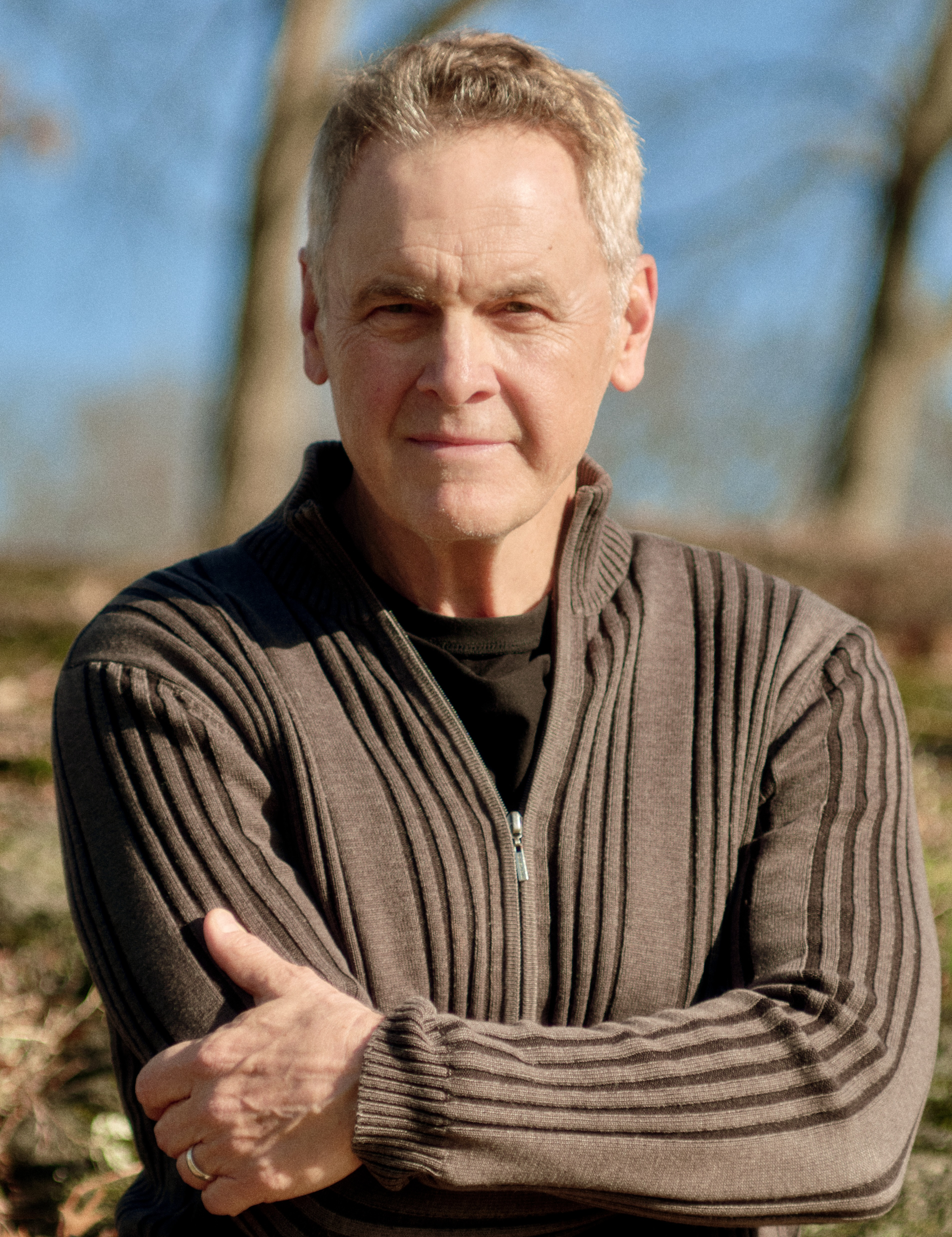
- Moses in 2026
- Born: February 24, 1958 (age 68); New York City, U.S.
- Education: New York University (BFA)
- Occupation: Actor
- Years active: 1985–present
- Spouse: Annie LaRussa
- Children: 2
- Family: Burke Moses (brother)

Mark Moses (born February 24, 1958) is an American actor. He is best known for his roles as Paul Young in the ABC comedy-drama Desperate Housewives (2004–2011) and as Herman "Duck" Phillips in the AMC period drama Mad Men (2007–2015).

== Early life ==
Moses was born in New York City. Moses attended Evanston Township High School in Illinois where he was quarterback of the school's varsity football team. He then enrolled at Ithaca College in Ithaca, New York, where he majored in English. Moses dropped out after a year to travel. He later enrolled at New York University, where he graduated with a degree in theater.

== Career ==
Moses began his career appearing briefly in the ABC daytime soap opera One Life to Live in 1983. Also in 1983, he appeared in the Broadway production of The Slab Boys Trilogy starring Kevin Bacon and Sean Penn. He later played a young Ulysses S. Grant in the ABC miniseries North and South and guest-starred on Family Ties, The Golden Girls and Matlock. Moses also appeared in a number of films by director Oliver Stone, such as Platoon (1986), Born on the Fourth of July (1989) and The Doors (1991).

Moses played supporting roles in a number of movies, including Gettysburg (1993), Deep Impact (1998), One Man's Hero (1999), Big Momma's House 2 (2006), Swing Vote (2008), Cesar Chavez (2014) and Bombshell (2019). His only leading film role was in the 1997 romantic comedy-drama Just in Time directed by Shawn Levy.

Moses also appeared in several made-for-television movies and was a regular cast member in the short-lived sitcoms Grand (1990) and The Single Guy (1995-96). He played Woodbury Kane in the 1997 miniseries Rough Riders and also guest-starred on Touched by an Angel, Star Trek: Voyager, ER, The West Wing, NYPD Blue, Drop Dead Diva, CSI: Crime Scene Investigation, Law & Order: Special Victims Unit, Scandal and Grey's Anatomy.

In 2004, Moses was cast as Paul Young in the ABC mystery comedy-drama series Desperate Housewives. As the disturbed husband of the deceased Mary Alice Young, Paul was a key character in the show's original main mystery. He left the series as a regular cast member after two seasons, but still made some guest appearances in the third season. Moses returned to the series as a series regular after appearing briefly in the sixth season finale, and was a regular through the 2010–11 season. Along with the rest of the cast, he received two Screen Actors Guild Award for Outstanding Performance by an Ensemble in a Comedy Series in 2005 and 2006.

In 2007, Moses joined the cast of AMC period drama series Mad Men playing a recurring role as Herman "Duck" Phillips. In 2009, he received another Screen Actors Guild Award, this time for Outstanding Performance by an Ensemble in a Drama Series for his Mad Men role. In 2012, he had a recurring role in the second season of AMC crime drama The Killing.

In 2014, he co-starred in the fourth season of the Showtime political drama Homeland playing Dennis Boyd. Moses also had recurring roles on various TV series such as Manhattan, Man Seeking Woman, Law & Order True Crime and Salvation. He played the recurring roles of Secretary of Housing and Urban Development, and later President Jeffrey Michener in the TNT series The Last Ship from 2015 to 2018, and in the Telemundo telenovela La Reina del Sur. In 2020, he was a regular cast member in the Fox crime drama Deputy, which, however, was cancelled after one season.

== Filmography ==
=== Film ===
Year	Title	Role	Notes
1986	Platoon	Lieutenant Wolfe	
1987	Someone to Watch Over Me	Win Hockings	
1989	Born on the Fourth of July	Optimistic Doctor	
1990	Hollywood Heartbreak	Randy Derringer / Abbey	
1990	Dead Men Don't Die	Jordan	
1991	The Doors	Jac Holzman	
1993	Gettysburg	Sergeant Owen	
1997	Just in Time	Michael Bedford	
1998	Deep Impact	Tim Urbanski	
1999	One Man's Hero	Colonel Benton Lacey	
1999	Treehouse Hostage	Rick Taylor	
2001	Race to Space	Alan Shepard	
2002	Red Dragon	Father in Video	
2004	The Remembering Movies	Jonathan Clifton	
2004	A One Time Thing	Dr. Norris	
2004	After the Sunset	Lakers FBI Agent	
2005	Monster-in-Law	Guy in Coffee Shop	
2006	Letters from Iwo Jima	American Officer	
2006	Big Momma's House 2	Tom Fuller	
2006	Two Tickets to Paradise	Football Dad	
2008	Swing Vote	Attorney General Wyatt	
2009	Carriers	Doctor	
2011	And They're Off	Alex Flamm	
2012	Seeking a Friend for the End of the World	Anchorman	
2012	Flare: The Hunt	Dale	
2013	Cesar Chavez	Fred Moss	
2014	Atlas Shrugged Part III: Who Is John Galt?	Midas Mulligan	
2016	Fear, Inc.	Abe	
2018	Mapplethorpe	Harry Mapplethorpe	
2019	The Gandhi Murder	Sir Percy Sillitoe	
2019	Bombshell	Bill Shine	
2020	Modern Persuasion	Grayson Keller	
2022	Follow Her	Richard	
2024	Reagan	William P. Clark Jr.	

=== Television ===
Year	Title	Role	Notes
1983	One Life to Live	Benny Stuart	2 episodes
1985	North and South	Young Ulysses S. Grant	Episode: "#1.1"
1985	Big Shots in America	Man	Television movie
1986	Family Ties	Rick Albert	Episode: "Teacher's Pet"
1988	The Tracker	Tom Adams	Television movie
1989	American Playhouse	Ira Martin	Episode: "The Silence at Bethany"
1990	The Golden Girls	David	Episode: "An Illegitimate Concern"
1990	Grand	Richard Peyton	20 episodes
1990	Matlock	Donald Ware	Episode: "The Cookie Monster"
1990	Father Dowling Mysteries	Everett	Episode: "The Movie Mystery"
1991	Empire City	—N/a	Television movie
1992	Perry Mason: The Case of the Fatal Framing	Joel McKelvey	Television movie
1994	Silk Stalkings	Paul Dyer	Episode: "Love Bandit"
1994	The Commish	Stuart Walsh	Episode: "The Letter of the Law"
1994	The George Carlin Show	Brad	Episode: "George Looks Down the Wrong End of .38"
1994	Diagnosis: Murder	Robin Westlin	Episode: "The Restless Remains"
1994	A Kiss Goodnight	Michael Turner	Television movie
1995	Diagnosis: Murder	Stuart Tyler	Episode: "How to Murder Your Lawyer"
1995	Party of Five	Ben Atkins	Episode: "It's Not Easy Being Green"
1995	The 5 Mrs. Buchanans	Reverend Charles Buchanan	Episode: "Becoming a Buchanan"
1995	The Single Guy	Matt Parker	Series Regular, 22 episodes
1995	The Crew	Jake	Episode: "Invitation to a Wedding"
1997	Rough Riders	Woodbury Kane	Television movie
1998	LateLine	Jack Hunter	Episode: "Al Anonymous"
1998	Chicago Hope	Ron Greenfield	Episode: "Wag the Doc"
1999	Pensacola: Wings of Gold	Agent Margolis	Episode: "Rules of Engagement"
1999	Family Law	—N/a	Episode: "Damages"
1999	Touched by an Angel	Seth	Episode: "The Last Day of the Rest of Your Life"
1999	Star Trek: Voyager	Naroq	Episode: "Riddles"
1999	It's Like, You Know...	Fred Swedlowe	Episode: "Hollywood Shuffle"
2000	Judging Amy	Mark Pruitt	Episode: "Shaken, Not Stirred"
2000	JAG	Deke Carson	Episode: "Real Deal SEAL"
2000	Beyond Belief: Fact or Fiction	Frank - Mystery Book Writer	Episode: "The Wailing"
2000	CSI: Crime Scene Investigation	Scott Shelton	Episode: "Sex, Lies and Larvae"
2001	Star Trek: Enterprise	Henry Archer	2 episodes
2001	What's Up, Peter Fuddy?	—N/a	Television movie
2001	James Dean	Dick Clayton	Television movie
2001–2002	Ally McBeal	Assistant District Attorney	2 episodes
2002	Providence	Mike Weaver	Episode: "It's Raining Men"
2002	Presidio Med	Nathan	2 episodes
2002	Boomtown	Don Schneider	Episode: "Coyote"
2002	In My Life	—N/a	Television movie
2003	Saving Jessica Lynch	Lieutenant	Television movie
2003	The Practice	Henry Winslow	Episode: "Character Evidence"
2003	ER	Mr. Marks	Episode: "When Night Meets Day"
2003	7th Heaven	Mr. Smith	Episode: "Long Bad Summer: Part 1"
2003	10-8: Officers on Duty	Dan Harris	Episode: "Gimme Shelter"
2003	The West Wing	Donald Richter	Episode: "Abu el Banat"
2004	Malcolm in the Middle	Richard	Episode: "The Block Party"
2004	The District	Richard Lowe	Episode: "Party Favors"
2004	Las Vegas	Dr. Miles Marks	Episode: "Things That Go Jump in the Night"
2004	NYPD Blue	Andrew Moss	Episode: "Who's Your Daddy?"
2004	Oliver Beene	Dr. Herbert	Episode: "Catskills"
2004–2011	Desperate Housewives	Paul Young	75 episodes Screen Actors Guild Award for Outstanding Performance by an Ensemble in a Comedy Series (2005–06)
2007	The Hill	Senator Rogers	Unsold TV pilot
2007	Without a Trace	Rob Darcy	Episode: "Without You"
2007–2008	Boston Legal	A.D.A. George McDougal	2 episodes
2007–2015	Mad Men	Herman "Duck" Phillips	21 episodes Screen Actors Guild Award for Outstanding Performance by an Ensemble in a Drama Series
2008	Law & Order: Special Victims Unit	James Grall	Episode: "Inconceivable"
2009	Drop Dead Diva	Joe Dopkins	Episode: "The Chinese Wall"
2009	Ghost Whisperer	Dr. Forrest Morgan	Episode: "Devil's Bargain"
2009	Castle	Blake Wellesley	Episode: "Kill the Messenger"
2009	Ice Twisters	Charlie Price	Television movie
2009	Acceptance	Wilson Rockefeller	Television movie
2010	Human Target	Hollis	Episode: "Pilot"
2010	CSI: Miami	Chuck Williams	Episode: "Mommy Deadest"
2011	Covert Affairs	Will	Episode: "Around the Sun"
2011	The Closer	Commissioner Jay Meyers	Episode: "Road Block"
2011–2013	Criminal Minds	Senator Cramer	3 episodes
2012	The Killing	Lt. Erick Clarkson	9 episodes
2012	Fairly Legal	Bob	Episode: "Satisfaction"
2012	Common Law	Mayor Richard Barnes	Episode: "The Ex-Factor"
2012	Key & Peele	Civil War General	2 episodes
2012	CSI: Crime Scene Investigation	Jeffrey Foresythe	Episode: "Risky Business Class"
2012	CSI: New York	Mr. Connors	Episode: "Late Admissions"
2013	Elementary	Oliver Purcell	Episode: "Dirty Laundry"
2013	Blue Bloods	Curtis Swint	Episode: "Inside Jobs"
2013	Scandal	Congressman Jim Struthers	Episode: "Mrs. Smith Goes to Washington"
2014	Rake	Dr. Sam Falcon	Episode: "Man's Best Friend"
2014	Manhattan	Col. Alden Cox	8 episodes
2014	Homeland	Dennis Boyd	7 episodes Nominated — Screen Actors Guild Award for Outstanding Performance by an Ensemble in a Drama Series
2015–2018	The Last Ship	President Jeffrey Michener	17 episodes
2016	Mr. Robot	Older Man at Bar	Episode: "eps2.6_succ3ss0r.p12"
2016	Crunch Time	Montgomery Wittington	Episodes: "The Party of the Century" and "The Moruga"
2016–2017	Incorporated	George Caplan	4 episodes
2016–2019	Berlin Station	Jason Wolfe	5 episodes
2017	Man Seeking Woman	Lucy's Dad	Episode: "Popcorn"
2017	Conviction	Gerald Harris	Episode: "Past, Prologue & What’s to Come"
2017	Law & Order: Special Victims Unit	George Thanos	Episode: "The Newsroom"
2017	Law & Order True Crime	Gil Garcetti	3 episodes
2017–2018	Salvation	Hugh Keating	7 episodes
2018	Grey's Anatomy	Dr. Larry Maxwell	Episode: "(Don't Fear) the Reaper"
2019	The Code	Col. Wesley Riggle	Episode: "Back on the Block"
2019	La Reina del Sur	President	3 episodes
2020	Deputy	Undersheriff Jerry London	Main role
2022	The First Lady	President George W. Bush	Episode: "That White House"
2022–2024	So Help Me Todd	Harry	4 episodes
2026	9-1-1: Nashville	Larry	Episode: "Bad Girls"
