= Nimrat Kaur =

Indian actress (born 1982)

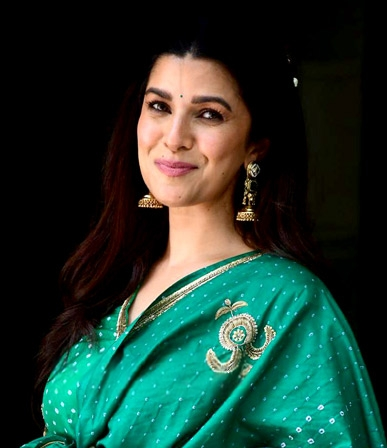
- Kaur in 2025
- Born: 13 March 1982 (age 44); Pilani, Jhunjhunu Rajasthan, India
- Education: Shri Ram College of Commerce
- Occupation: Actress
- Years active: 2002–present
- Parent: Bhupender Singh (father)

Nimrat Kaur (born 13 March 1982) is an Indian actress who appears in Hindi films and in American television. She began her career as a print model and went on to act in theatre. After brief appearances in a few films, Kaur starred in Anurag Kashyap's production Peddlers (2012). She followed it with her breakthrough role in the critically acclaimed drama The Lunchbox (2014).

In 2015, Kaur played the recurring role of Inter-Services Intelligence (ISI) agent Tasneem Qureishi in the fourth season of the American television series Homeland, and later reprised her role in its eighth season. She co-starred with Akshay Kumar in the war thriller Airlift. Kaur has since starred in the American mystery series Wayward Pines (2016) and the Indian drama series School of Lies (2023).

== Early life and education ==
Nimrat Kaur was born into a Sikh family in Pilani, Jhunjhunu, Rajasthan, on 13 March 1982. Her father, Major Bhupender Singh was an Indian Army officer who was awarded with Shaurya Chakra, and she has a younger sister, Rubina, who is a psychologist based in Bangalore.

Her family lived in Patiala, and she studied at Yadavindra Public School, Patiala. In 1994, her father was abducted and killed by a Hizbul Mujahideen terrorist. Thereafter, her family moved to Delhi-suburb, Noida, where she grew up and attended Delhi Public School, Noida. Later, she studied at Shri Ram College of Commerce, Delhi University and obtained a B.Com. Hons. in commerce.

== Career ==
=== Early work and debut (2012–2015) ===
After her studies, Kaur moved to Mumbai and worked as a print model. She began working as a theatre actress, appearing in plays such as Baghdad Wedding (2012), All About Women, and Red Sparrow, working with directors like Sunil Shanbag and Manav Kaul.

Kaur was launched on screen in a two-part music video for the songs "Tera Mera Pyar" by Kumar Sanu and "Yeh Kya Hua" by Shreya Ghoshal in 2004. The videos were directed by writer-editor Apurva Asrani. She also did TV advertisements.

Kaur made her film debut with a small role in an English film, One Night with the King (2006), which was shot in Rajasthan. Her Hindi film debut came with Peddlers in 2012, produced by Anurag Kashyap. The film was screened at Cannes Film Festival to good reviews. Kaur came to public attention in India when she appeared in a mid-2013 Dairy Milk Silk commercial.

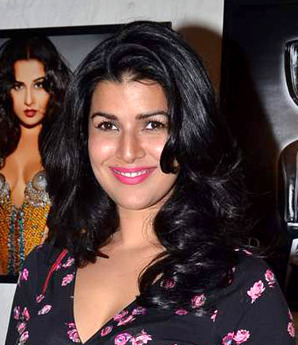
Kaur in 2014

In 2013, Kaur also came to wider attention with her co-lead role in the epistolary romantic film The Lunchbox, when it aired at the Cannes Film Festival – her second consecutive appearance at Cannes. The film was a commercial and critical success, with Kaur receiving rave reviews for her portrayal of a lonely wife who begins a friendship with a stranger (Irrfan Khan) through letters in a tiffin carrier, (initially) mistakenly delivered to the stranger by a dabbawala. Raja Sen of Rediff.com said of Kaur's performance: "It is a disarmingly natural performance that is impossible to forget and difficult to analyse, and in this limited space one may merely express admiration." Jay Weissberg of Variety called her a "radiant presence", while Pratim D. Gupta of The Telegraph wrote that "Nimrat strips off all the sentimentality to attach dignity and grace to the character. This one's a sparkling debut."

In 2014, Kaur appeared as ISI agent Tasneem Qureishi in the fourth season of the American TV series Homeland.

=== Career expansion (2016–present) ===
In 2016, she acted in the war drama Airlift, alongside Akshay Kumar. Based on the civil operation of evacuation of Indians based in Kuwait during the Iraq-Kuwait war, the film was released on 22 January to mostly positive reviews. Rajeev Masand in his review wrote: "For the most part, the film feels authentic, and Nimrat Kaur blends right in. Just a wee bit awkward in the early scenes, she comes into her own by the time she must deliver a scathing monologue during a crisis of faith over her husband's actions." The film was a financial success. Kaur also began portraying Rebecca Yedlin in the second season of the American television series Wayward Pines in 2016.

In 2017, Kaur starred as Captain Shikha Sharma in the Hindi web series The Test Case and received positive response. She returned for the eighth and final season of Homeland as a series regular in February 2020. A Harini Prasad of The New Indian Express commented on her "commendable acting chops" and the "positive response" she has received for her work in the final season.

After a four-year hiatus, Kaur co-starred in the 2022 Netflix film Dasvi, playing Haryana's CM alongside Abhishek Bachchan. Grace Cyril of India Today reviewed the film and stated, "Though Nimrat Kaur's character in Dasvi was confusing, she lit up the film with her performance."

In 2023, she portrayed Yanna Seldon in the second season of the science fiction series Foundation. In the same year, she played School counsellor in the web series School of Lies. She played an inspector in Sajini Shinde Ka Viral Video, her final work of the year. Saibal Chatterjee of NDTV praised her and said, "It is Nimrat Kaur who saves the day with a solid, admirably consistent performance as the investigator who has much more on her plate than just a case of a missing girl."

Kaur next appeared in the 2025 film Sky Force, in her second collaboration with Akshay Kumar after Airlift (2016), and season three of the television series The Family Man.

== Filmography ==
Key
†	Denotes films that have not yet been released

=== Films ===
- All films are in Hindi unless otherwise noted.

Year	Title	Role	Notes	Ref.
2005	Yahaan	News anchor interviewer		
2006	One Night with the King	Sarah	English film	
2010	Encounter		Short film	
2012	Peddlers	Kuljeet		
2012	Luv Shuv Tey Chicken Khurana	Muskaan Khurana	Cameo appearance	
2013	The Lunchbox	Ila	Nominated—IIFA Award for Best Actress; Nominated—Screen Award for Best Actress	
2015	El'ayichi	Padu	Short film	
2015	My Choice		English short film	
2016	Airlift	Amrita Katyaal		
2022	Dasvi	Bimla "Bimmo" Devi Chaudhary		
2023	Sajini Shinde Ka Viral Video	Inspector Bela Barot		
2025	Sky Force	Preeti Ahuja		
2025	Kaalidhar Laapata	Meera	Special appearance	
2026	Section 84 †	TBA	Completed	

=== Television ===
Year	Title	Role	Notes	Ref.
2014; 2020	Homeland	Tasneem Qureishi	Recurring (season 4); Main (season 8)	
2016	Wayward Pines	Rebecca Yedlin	Main (season 2)	
2016	Love Shots	Arshi	Film #1: The Road Trip	
2017–2018	The Test Case	Capt. Shikha Sharma		
2023	School of Lies	Nandita Mehra		
2023	Foundation	Yanna Seldon	Recurring (season 2)	
2025	Kull: The Legacy of the Raisingghs	Idrani Raisinggh	Main	
2025	The Family Man	Meera Eston	Season 3	

=== Music videos ===
Year	Title	Singer	Ref.
2005	"Tera Mera Pyar"	Kumar Sanu	
2005	"Ye Kya Hua"	Shreya Ghoshal	
2009	"Chaandan Mein"	Kailash Kher	
