= Numan Acar =

Turkish-born German actor and film producer

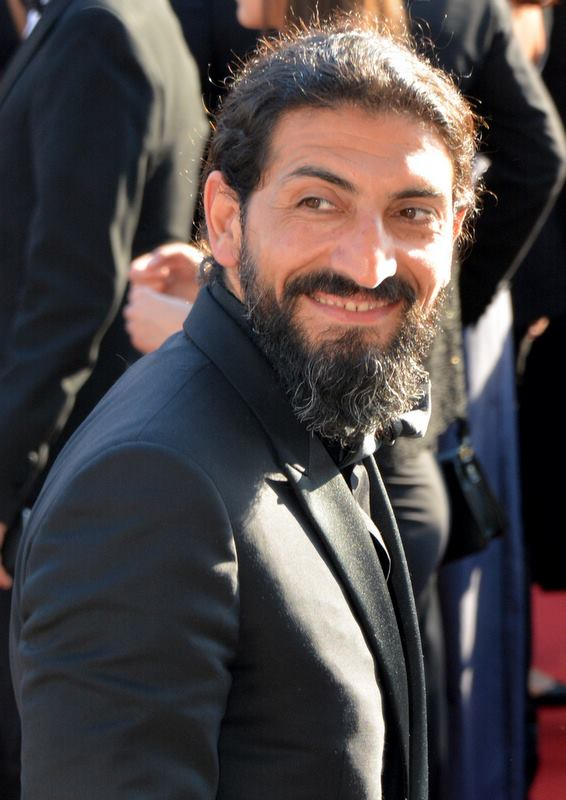
- Acar at the 2017 Cannes Film Festival
- Born: 7 October 1974 (age 52); Turkey
- Occupations: Actor, producer
- Years active: 2003–present

Numan Acar (born 7 October 1974) is a Turkish-German actor and film producer.

== Early life and education ==
Numan Acar was born on 7 October 1974 in the village of Kozoglu in Turkey, before his family emigrated to Germany in 1982.

After completing high school, he did a bricklaying apprenticeship. He then studied civil engineering in Wiesbaden, graduating in 2001. While at university, he discovered his love of acting after filling in on stage for another actor.

== Career ==
Acar started performing in both Turkish and German films, then started Acar Entertainment in 2007, producing German-Turkish movies.

After numerous roles in Turkish, German, and South Korean film and television productions, Acar played his first role in an American production in 2014, as Haissam Haqqani in season four of Homeland. He reprised the role in 2020 for Homeland's eighth and final season.

He portrayed Dimitri in the 2019 Marvel film, Spider-Man: Far From Home.

== Personal life ==
Acar, who lives in Berlin, speaks several languages fluently including German, Turkish, Spanish, and English, and also has knowledge of Kurdish, Azerbaijani, and Arabic.

== Filmography ==
=== Film ===
Year	Title	Role	Note
2003	Angelina	Murat	Short film
2003	Linie X	1. Türke	Short film
2004	Riechen	Mann	Short film
2004	Kebab Connection	Schwertkämpfer	
2005	Max and Moritz Reloaded	Bülent, Fighter	
2006	7		Short film
2006	Killing the Shadows (Hacivat Karagöz Neden Öldürüldü?)	Trasci Ali	
2006	Lieben	Hakan	
2006	Cenneti Beklerken	Mustafa	
2006	Eve Giden Yol 1914	Vartolu Settar	
2007	Refugee (Mülteci)	Azad	
2008	Run for Your Life!	Salih	
2008	For a Moment, Freedom (Ein Augenblick Freiheit)		
2008	Dot (Punkt)		
2008	Pure Random	The Killed	Short film
2008	Last Look	Boom Operator	
2009	Fire!	Rashid	
2009	The Basement	Terek	
2010	Time You Change (Zeiten ändern dich)	Jussuf	
2010	Takiye: Allah yolunda	Mesut	
2010	The Coming Days	Botschafter	
2011	Kokowääh	Arbeiter Gewerbehof	
2011	Labirent	Bk44	
2012	Berlin Kaplani	Hodcha	
2012	Schutzengel	TV Reporter Türkei	
2013	The Berlin File	Abdul	
2013	The Immortalizer	Hassan	Short film
2014	Vergrabene Stimmen	Kaan	
2014	Flying Home	Karadeniz	
2014	Rosewater	Rahim	
2014	The Cut	Alpasan	Uncredited
2015	Point Break	Turkish doorman	
2016	Ali and Nino	Seyid Mustafa	
2016	The Promise	Mustafa	
2016	The Great Wall	Najid	
2016	Sister Moon	Feuerwolf	Short film
2017	In the Fade	Nuri Sekerci	
2018	12 Strong	Mullah Razzan	
2019	Aladdin	Hakim	
2019	Spider-Man: Far From Home	Dimitri	
2020	In the Shadows	Zait	
2023	Paradise	Viktor	
2025	Desert Warrior	Ebn Wael	
2027	The Mummy: Book of the Dead †	TBA	Filming
TBA	The Way of the Wind †	TBA	Post-production

=== Television ===
Year	Title	Role	Note
2003	Fast perfekt verlobt		TV film
2003	Nach so vielen Jahren	Stage Worker	TV film
2003	Mit einem Rutsch ins Glück	Tango lehrer	TV film
2005	Die Gerichtsmedizinerin	Metzger	Episode: "Die letzte Reise"
2006	SOKO Kitzbühel	Bollywood Film Hero	Episode: "Blumen für die Diva"
2006	Freunde für immer – Das Leben ist rund	Indischer Taxifahrer	Episode: "Elf Freunde"
2007	Dr. Psycho – Die Bösen, die Bullen, meine Frau und ich	Jugo	2 episodes
2007	CÖT (Cok Özel Tim)	Mahir	1 episode
2007	Menekşe ile Halil	Mehmet	Episode: "The Escape"
2008	Bible Code (Der Bibelcode)	Victor	TV film
2008	Alarm für Cobra 11 – Die Autobahnpolizei	Hassan	Episode: "Am Ende der Jugend"
2009	Lasko – Die Faust Gottes	Prinz Jamal al Raschid	Episode: "Der Ölprinz"
2011	Homicide Unit Istanbul (Mordkommission Istanbul)	Cemil	Episode: "Der Preis des Lebens"
2011	Kung Fu Mama	Jussuf	TV film
2011	Nina sieht es ...!!!	Santini	TV film
2011	Men Are Wired One Way, Women Another	Rezeptionist	TV film
2012	Cologne P.D. (SOKO Köln)	Darko	Episode: "Fischer gegen Fischer"
2012	Blood Eagle	Mamoot	TV film
2013	Achtung Polizei!	Taifun	TV film
2014–2020	Homeland	Haissam Haqqani	Main Cast (seasons 4, 8)
2015	Crossing Lines	Borz Dudayev	Episode: "Expose"
2017	Prison Break	Abu Ramal	3 episodes
2018	Lore	Dirvick Mirandesh	Episode: "Prague Clock: The Curse of Orloj"
2018–2022	Jack Ryan	Tony	2 episodes
2026	Legends	Hakan	6 episodes
2026	Young Sherlock	Esad Kasgarli	6 episodes
