= The Bridge (2013 TV series) =

2013 American crime drama television series

- Genre: Crime drama Drama
- Based on: Broen/Bron by: Hans Rosenfeldt; Måns Mårlind; Björn Stein
- Developed by: Meredith Stiehm; Elwood Reid
- Starring: Diane Kruger; Demián Bichir; Annabeth Gish; Thomas M. Wright; Ted Levine; Matthew Lillard; Emily Rios
- Theme music composer: Ryan Bingham
- Opening theme: "Until I'm One with You"
- Country of origin: United States
- Original languages: English; Spanish
- No. of seasons: 2
- No. of episodes: 26 (list of episodes)

Production
- Executive producers: Meredith Stiehm; Elwood Reid; Carolyn G. Bernstein; Lars Blomgren
- Production locations: El Paso, Texas; Tijuana, Mexico; Los Angeles, California
- Running time: 40–62 minutes
- Production companies: Shorewood, Inc.; Elwood Reid, Inc.; FX Productions; Filmlance; Shine America

Original release
- Network: FX
- Release: July 10, 2013 – October 1, 2014

The Bridge is an American crime drama television series, developed by Meredith Stiehm and Elwood Reid, that was broadcast on the FX network, and based on the Danish-Swedish series Bron/Broen. The series stars Diane Kruger and Demián Bichir in leading roles, and co-stars Ted Levine, Annabeth Gish, Thomas M. Wright, Matthew Lillard and Emily Rios in supporting roles. The complete series consists of two seasons of 13 episodes each. The series debuted on FX in the United States on July 10, 2013, and the series finale aired on October 1, 2014. The show was developed both in English and Spanish languages.

The American version takes place on the Mexico–United States border where a murdered body on a bridge between El Paso and Juárez (the Bridge of the Americas) brings together El Paso detective Sonya Cross (Kruger) who is mentored by Hank Wade (Levine) and Chihuahua State police detective Marco Ruiz (Bichir). The story parallels the investigation by El Paso Times reporters Daniel Frye (Lillard) and Adriana Mendez (Rios). The series was a critical success and received positive reviews throughout its run. After the first season maintained a modest audience that dropped by 42 percent by the second, the series was not renewed for a third season.

== Plot ==
The Bridge follows two police detectives – one Mexican, one from the U.S. – and their joint effort to capture a serial killer who is operating in both countries when an American judge known for anti-immigration views is found dead on the bridge connecting El Paso, Texas, with Juárez, Mexico, menacing both nations along the Texas–Chihuahua border. Detective Sonya Cross, of the El Paso Police Department, works with Chihuahua State Police Detective Marco Ruiz, who knows about the slippery politics of Mexican law enforcement. Ruiz's whatever-it-takes approach doesn't sit well with Cross, who has undisclosed Asperger syndrome or a similar autism spectrum disorder and a by-the-book attitude when it comes to the job. But the two put their differences aside to solve a string of murders on the border, which is already infected with issues that include illegal immigration, drug trafficking, violence and prostitution. Their investigation is complicated by the rampant corruption and general apathy among the Mexican authorities and the violence of the powerful borderland drug cartels. The show title refers to the Bridge of the Americas that serves as a border crossing between El Paso, Texas, and Ciudad Juárez, Chihuahua, where the series is set.

== Production ==
FX ordered the series' pilot episode in July 2012. Shooting for the pilot took place on location in the El Paso area and wrapped in December 2012. Critically acclaimed director Gerardo Naranjo, best known for 2011's Miss Bala, directed the pilot.

Work on the remaining twelve season one episodes began in early April 2013. Meredith Stiehm, creator of Cold Case, and Elwood Reid served as the series' executive producers and head writers. The show was co-produced by Shine America and FX Productions for FX. Alex Plank of Wrong Planet served as the consultant for Sonya's Asperger syndrome.

Shine America wanted Stiehm to begin the series on the Ambassador Bridge connecting Detroit and Windsor, Ontario, in order to mirror the original series' winter setting. However, Stiehm and Reid argued to set their version in El Paso, Texas and Ciudad Juárez at the Bridge of the Americas.

In September 2013, the series was renewed for a second season of 13 episodes. After the first season, co-developer Meredith Stiehm departed the series to rejoin the writing staff of her previous TV series, Homeland, leaving Elwood Reid as the sole showrunner for the second season. Also, Matthew Lillard and Emily Rios, who had recurring roles in the first season, were promoted to series regulars for the second season. The series was canceled after two seasons. John Solberg, FX's executive vice president of communications, said, "FX will not be moving forward with a third season of The Bridge. Creatively, we're very proud of what we done. But this came down to the numbers, and they just weren't there."

== Cast and characters ==
=== Main cast ===
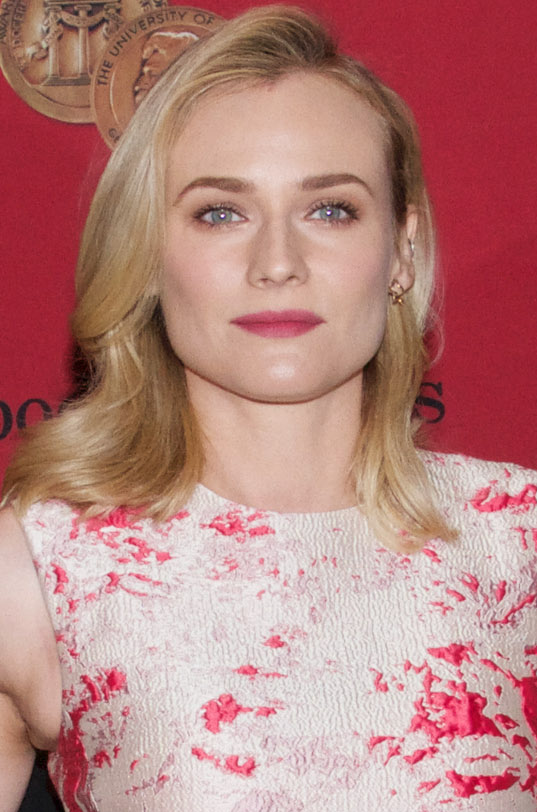
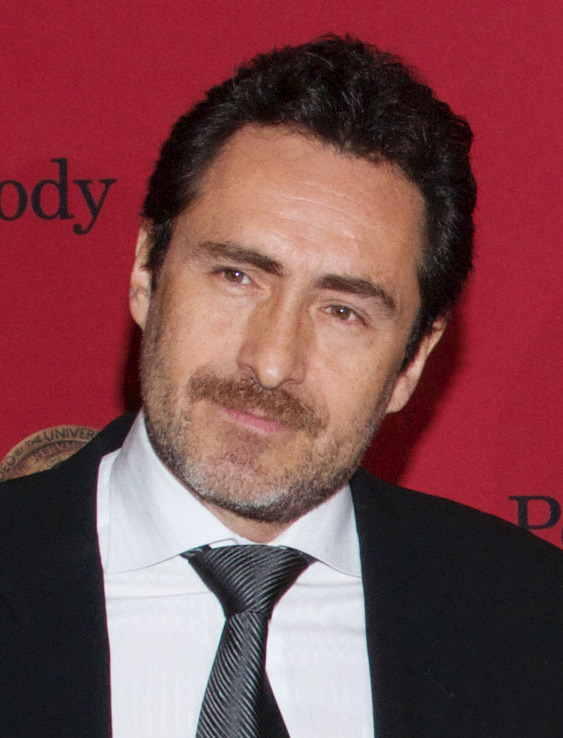
The show stars Diane Kruger (left) and Demián Bichir (right) as detectives from El Paso and Juárez, respectively, who work together to take down a serial killer
- Diane Kruger as Det. Sonya Cross: a member of the El Paso Police Department who has undiagnosed Asperger syndrome. Her sister Lisa Cross was killed when Sonya was 15. Sonya still visits her sister's murderer, who now has brain damage, and keeps his drawings on the fridge – maybe to try to find out why he killed her sister.
- Demián Bichir as Det. Marco Ruiz: a homicide detective for the Policía Estatal (State Police) of the Mexican state of Chihuahua.
- Ted Levine as Lieutenant Hank Wade: a jaded El Paso cop and Cross' supervisor. He finds himself often counseling Cross to be more diplomatic in her single-minded determination to catch the killer.
- Annabeth Gish as Charlotte Millwright: a wealthy widow whose rancher husband suffers a myocardial infarction on the Mexican side of the border and dies back in El Paso. Shocking secrets about his cross-border activities quickly come to light as Ruiz and Cross' investigation commences.
- Thomas M. Wright as Steven Linder: a "lone wolf" trying to survive in a near-lawless borderland
- Matthew Lillard as Daniel Frye (season 2; recurring season 1): an El Paso Times reporter whose once-promising career has been derailed by a life of partying and substance abuse
- Emily Rios as Adriana Mendez (season 2; recurring season 1): a young reporter for the Times, who is a Juárez native.

=== Recurring cast ===
- Johnny Dowers as Tim Cooper: an El Paso PD detective
- Eric Lange as Kenneth Hasting: a colleague of Alma's who becomes her confidante
- Carlos Pratts as Gus Ruiz: Marco's son
- Catalina Sandino Moreno as Alma Ruiz: Marco's wife
- Ramón Franco as Fausto Galvan: a cartel leader, and the owner of El Rey Storage
- Alejandro Patiño as Cesar: loyal confidant of Karl Millwright, and Charlotte's window into her husband's shady dealings
- Juan Carlos Cantu as Captain Robles: Detective Ruiz's supervisor in Juárez
- Diana-Maria Riva as Kitty Conchas: the El Paso PD's desk clerk who is of Mexican heritage, but speaks no Spanish
- Stephanie Sigman as Eva Guerra: Hector's girlfriend and the object of Linder's affections
- Alma Martínez as Graciela Rivera: a smuggler and former associate of Karl Millwright, who intimidates Charlotte into allowing her continued access to Charlotte's ranch
- Brian Van Holt as Ray: Charlotte's shady former lover who she enlists to help her deal with Graciela Rivera
- Daniel Edward Mora as Obregon: Fausto's bodyguard and enforcer
- Larry Clarke as Manny Stokes: an overeager El Paso County sheriff's deputy
- Lyle Lovett as Monte P. Flagman: Graciela Rivera's lawyer
- Arturo Del Puerto as Hector Valdez: an employee of Fausto's
- Don Swayze as Tim: Ray's contact in Tampa
- Chris Browning as Jackson Childress: an immigrant hunter
- Franka Potente as Eleanor Nacht: a "fixer" for the cartel
- Manuel Uriza as Abelardo Pintado: a Mexican state prosecutor investigating police corruption in Juárez
- Nathan Phillips as Jack Dobbs: the brother of Jim Dobbs, the man who killed Sonya's sister
- Abraham Benrubi as Agent Joe Mackenzie: a DEA agent investigating Fausto Galvan
- Bruno Bichir as Sebastian Cerisola: the CEO of Grupo Clio, which is connected to the Mexican cartel
- Jenny Pellicer as Romina Cerisola: the daughter of Sebastian Cerisola.

== Episodes ==
Season	Episodes	Originally released	
Season	Episodes	First released	Last released
1	13	July 10, 2013	October 2, 2013
2	13	July 9, 2014	October 1, 2014

== Reception ==
=== Critical response ===
On the review aggregator website Metacritic, the first season scored 77 out of 100, based on 37 reviews, indicating "generally favorable reviews". The review aggregator Rotten Tomatoes gave the first season a 91% rating based on 46 reviews at an average score of 8 out of 10, with the consensus "A seductive crime drama, The Bridge draws viewers in with culturally conscious themes that combine intelligent mystery and spellbinding drama." Chuck Barney from the San Jose Mercury News gave The Bridge its highest praise, saying: "FX may have struck dramatic gold again. This series is mesmerizing. It sucks you in like a good book and has you yearning for more." Alan Sepinwall wrote, "With these characters, with this fascinating, complicated place – and one that's at the forefront of so much of what we're talking about in real world politics... The Bridge is off to such an outstanding start."

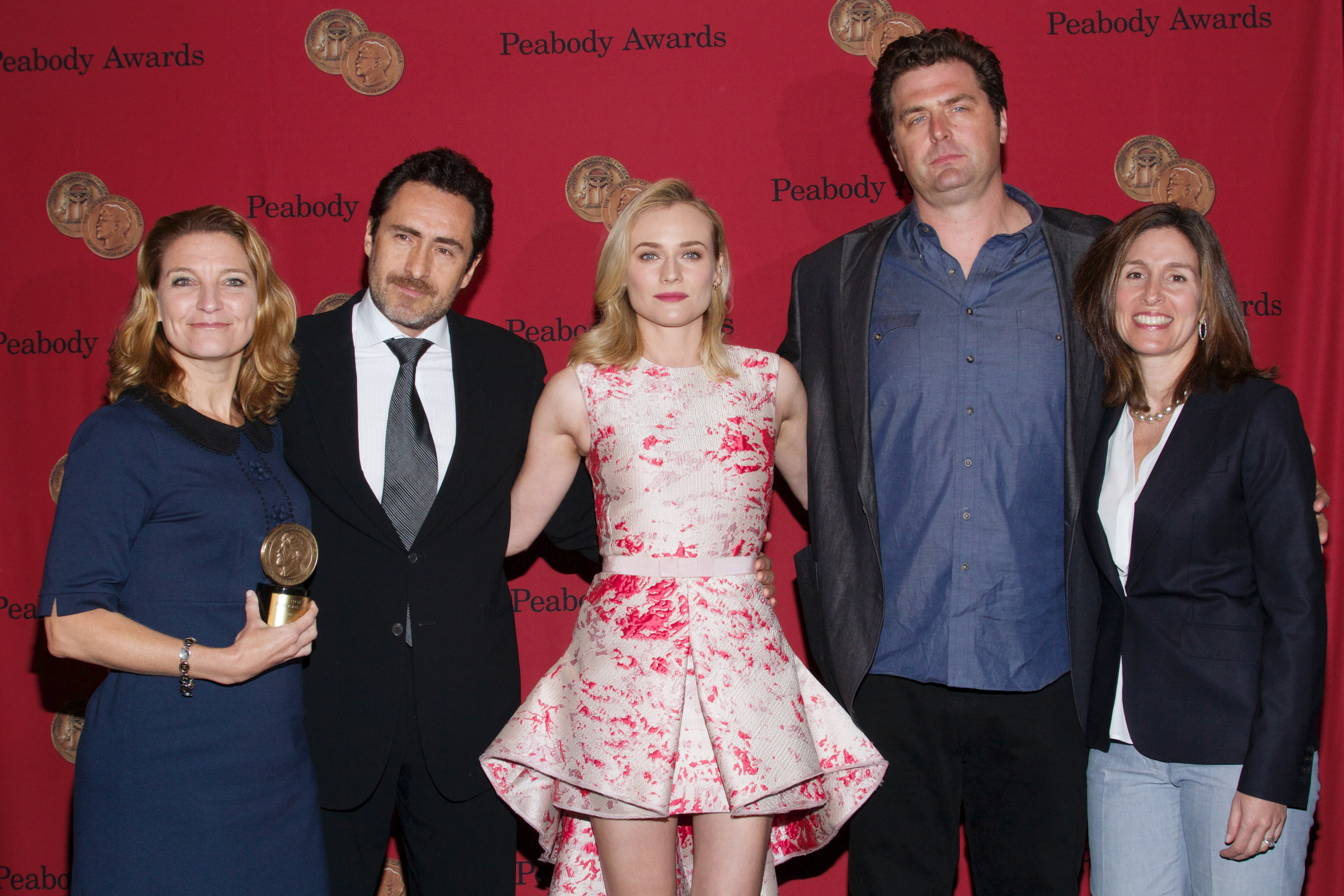
Series co-creators Meredith Stiehm and Elwood Reid with cast members Diane Kruger and Demián Bichir at the 73rd Annual Peabody Awards.

Maureen Ryan from The Huffington Post commented: "Mismatched cops forced to work together is one of the oldest TV tropes in the book, but The Bridge builds such a realistic, detailed world around the detectives here that the dynamic is often fresh." The Hollywood Reporter's Tim Goodman called the series "mandatory viewing for drama lovers", adding, "but it will be interesting to see where the writers take it and whether they have the big-league ability to make the evident potential materialize. One thing they've hopefully learned is that sometimes holding back information isn't mysterious, it's just confusing." Robert Bianco from USA Today thought there was "rich ground to explore in the problems Mexico faces and the responsibility we may bear for some of them", adding "but the show's clumsy attempt to boil that down to a catchphrase is offensive and silly, particularly as it has no real connection to the story being told."

The second season received a Metacritic score of 67 out of 100, based on 13 reviews, indicating "generally favorable reviews". On Rotten Tomatoes the second season received an 86% rating based on 22 reviews at an average score of 7.5 out of 10 and the consensus reads, "Thanks to beautiful cinematography and unique, captivating characters, The Bridge is a chilling murder mystery, even if it meanders slightly." Alan Sepinwall writing for HitFix hugely praised the season saying, "It's a show with a much stronger command of its subject matter and awareness of its own strengths and weaknesses–even as The Bridge still seems to be stuck in that nebulous border region separating the pretty good from the genuinely great. Maureen Ryan of The Huffington Post also gave a positive review, "It moves along with purpose and energy, but it's often at its best when finding colorful details and or allowing small, telling moments to breathe."

New York Post reviewer Robert Rorke called the show "unique" and wrote, "Drug cartels, a room of shrink-wrapped bills (worth $60 million), body bags and buckets of blood are just some of the intriguing elements in this uniquely Mexican-American drama, where the layers of corruption on both sides of the border seem impenetrable." Mike Hale of The New York Times gave a mixed to positive review saying, "The Bridge still feels like a show caught between two masters. It has a lot of the pieces it needs to actually be a compelling murder mystery–some good performances in key roles; an evocative, sun-blasted look; and an ability (presumably Mr. Reid's) to concoct creepy, suspenseful scenes. Yet we're still waiting for it all to come together."

=== Awards ===
In June 2013, the series was honored, along with five others, with the Critics' Choice Television Award for Most Exciting New Series. The pilot episode of the series received the 2013 Golden Reel Award for Best Sound Editing in Television: Long Form – Dialogue & ADR from the Motion Picture Sound Editors society. The series won a 2013 Peabody Award, which noted that "its rare, non-stereotypical depiction of two cultures rubbing against and informing each other is as fascinating as the mystery."
