= List of Cold Case episodes =

This is an episode list for the American police procedural television series Cold Case, which premiered on CBS on September 28, 2003.

Seasons one through three and season six comprised 23 hour-long episodes each, while season four included an additional episode for a total of 24. Season five comprised the fewest episodes, with 18, due to the 2007–08 Writers Guild of America strike. The final season, season seven, which premiered on September 27, 2009, consisted of 22 episodes.

During the course of the series, 156 episodes of Cold Case aired over seven seasons, between September 28, 2003, and May 2, 2010.

== Series overview ==
Season	Episodes	Originally released	
Season	Episodes	First released	Last released
1	23	September 28, 2003	May 23, 2004
2	23	October 3, 2004	May 22, 2005
3	23	September 25, 2005	May 21, 2006
4	24	September 24, 2006	May 6, 2007
5	18	September 23, 2007	May 4, 2008
6	23	September 28, 2008	May 10, 2009
7	22	September 27, 2009	May 2, 2010

== Episodes ==
=== Season 1 (2003–04) ===
No. overall	No. in season	Title	Directed by	Written by	Original release date	Prod. code	US viewers (millions)
1	1	"Look Again"	Mark Pellington	Meredith Stiehm	September 28, 2003	475195	15.85
2	2	"Gleen"	Paris Barclay	Jan Oxenberg	October 5, 2003	176702	13.96
3	3	"Our Boy Is Back"	Bryan Spicer	Stacy Kravetz	October 12, 2003	176704	12.82
4	4	"Churchgoing People"	Mark Pellington	Meredith Stiehm	October 19, 2003	176701	11.62
5	5	"The Runner"	David Straiton	Veena Cabreros Sud	October 26, 2003	176703	13.37
6	6	"Love Conquers Al"	Greg Yaitanes	Kim Newton	November 9, 2003	176706	14.39
7	7	"A Time to Hate"	Deran Sarafian	Jan Oxenberg	November 16, 2003	176707	13.90
8	8	"Fly Away"	James Whitmore, Jr.	Veena Cabreros Sud	November 30, 2003	176708	16.47
9	9	"Sherry Darlin'"	Rachel Talalay	Sean Whitesell	December 7, 2003	176705	15.39
10	10	"The Hitchhiker"	Marita Grabiak	Sean Whitesell	December 21, 2003	176709	13.95
11	11	"Hubris"	Agnieszka Holland	Stacy Kravetz & Kim Newton	January 11, 2004	176710	15.20
12	12	"Glued"	Peter Markle	Tyler Bensinger	January 18, 2004	176711	12.80
13	13	"The Letter"	Tim Hunter	Veena Cabreros Sud	January 25, 2004	176713	15.75
14	14	"Boy in the Box"	Karen Gaviola	Meredith Stiehm	February 15, 2004	176712	17.33
15	15	"Disco Inferno"	James Whitmore, Jr.	Tyler Bensinger	February 22, 2004	176715	15.34
16	16	"Volunteers"	Allison Anders	Jan Oxenberg	March 7, 2004	176716	15.98
17	17	"The Lost Soul of Herman Lester"	Tim Matheson	Sean Whitesell	March 14, 2004	176714	15.92
18	18	"Resolutions"	Alex Zakrzewski	Kim Newton	March 28, 2004	176717	14.26
19	19	"Late Returns"	David Straiton	Jay Beattie & Dan Dworkin	April 4, 2004	176718	14.25
20	20	"Greed"	Karen Gaviola	Stacy Kravetz	April 18, 2004	176719	12.93
21	21	"Maternal Instincts"	Kevin Hooks	Laurie Arent	April 25, 2004	176720	14.83
22	22	"The Plan"	Agnieszka Holland	Veena Cabreros Sud	May 2, 2004	176721	14.39
23	23	"Lover's Lane"	Nelson McCormick	Meredith Stiehm	May 23, 2004	176722	14.53

=== Season 2 (2004–05) ===
No. overall	No. in season	Title	Directed by	Written by	Original release date	Prod. code	US viewers (millions)
24	1	"The Badlands"	Tim Matheson	Chris Mundy	October 3, 2004	177751	15.03
25	2	"Factory Girls"	David Von Ancken	Story by : Stacy Kravetz; Teleplay by : Meredith Stiehm	October 10, 2004	177755	15.50
26	3	"Daniela"	David Barrett	Veena Cabreros Sud	October 17, 2004	177752	15.68
27	4	"The House"	Alex Zakrzewski	Sean Whitesell	October 24, 2004	177753	15.38
28	5	"Who's Your Daddy?"	Greg Yaitanes	Tyler Bensinger	October 31, 2004	177754	16.20
29	6	"The Sleepover"	Emilio Estevez	Liz W. Garcia	November 7, 2004	177757	17.66
30	7	"It's Raining Men"	Paul Holahan	Jan Oxenberg	November 14, 2004	177756	18.43
31	8	"Red Glare"	Tim Matheson	Jay Beattie & Dan Dworkin	November 21, 2004	177758	15.58
32	9	"Mind Hunters"	Kevin Bray	Veena Cabreros Sud	November 28, 2004	177759	17.51
33	10	"Discretion"	James Whitmore, Jr.	Henry Robles	December 19, 2004	177760	14.81
34	11	"Blank Generation"	David Barrett	Chris Mundy	January 9, 2005	177761	15.57
35	12	"Yo, Adrian"	James Whitmore, Jr.	Sean Whitesell	January 16, 2005	177762	15.67
36	13	"Time to Crime"	Tim Hunter	Tyler Bensinger	January 30, 2005	177763	16.69
37	14	"Revolution"	Alex Zakrzewski	Liz W. Garcia	February 20, 2005	177764	15.41
38	15	"Wishing"	Emilio Estevez	Karin Lewicki	March 6, 2005	177765	15.77
39	16	"Revenge"	David Von Ancken	Dan Dworkin & Jay Beattie	March 13, 2005	177766	16.61
40	17	"Schadenfreude"	Tim Matheson	Gina Gionfriddo	March 20, 2005	177767	17.29
41	18	"Ravaged"	James Whitmore, Jr.	Meredith Stiehm & Henry Robles	March 27, 2005	177769	13.24
42	19	"Strange Fruit"	Paris Barclay	Veena Cabreros Sud	April 3, 2005	177768	14.84
43	20	"Kensington"	Bill Eagles	Sean Whitesell	April 24, 2005	177770	16.74
44	21	"Creatures of the Night"	Alex Zakrzewski	Tyler Bensinger	May 1, 2005	177771	16.28
45	22	"Best Friends"	Mark Pellington	Liz W. Garcia	May 8, 2005	177772	14.77
46	23	"The Woods"	Nelson McCormick	Veena Cabreros Sud	May 22, 2005	177773	14.60

=== Season 3 (2005–06) ===
No. overall	No. in season	Title	Directed by	Written by	Original release date	Prod. code	US viewers (millions)
47	1	"Family"	Mark Pellington	Meredith Stiehm	September 25, 2005	2T6-352	13.68
48	2	"The Promise"	Paris Barclay	Veena Cabreros Sud	October 2, 2005	2T6-353	16.67
49	3	"Bad Night"	Kevin Bray	Andrea Newman	October 9, 2005	2T6-354	15.88
50	4	"Colors"	Paris Barclay	Sean Whitesell	October 16, 2005	2T6-351	14.15
51	5	"Committed"	Alex Zakrzewski	Liz W. Garcia	October 23, 2005	2T6-355	14.95
52	6	"Saving Patrick Bubley"	Marcos Siega	Tyler Bensinger	November 6, 2005	2T6-357	16.62
53	7	"Start-Up"	James Whitmore Jr.	Karin Lewicki	November 13, 2005	2T6-356	17.42
54	8	"Honor"	Paris Barclay	Craig Turk	November 20, 2005	2T6-358	17.08
55	9	"A Perfect Day"	Roxann Dawson	Veena Cabreros Sud	November 27, 2005	2T6-359	19.37
56	10	"Frank's Best"	Michael Schultz	Andrea Newman	December 18, 2005	2T6-360	15.22
57	11	"8 Years"	Mark Pellington	Meredith Stiehm	January 8, 2006	2T6-361	15.95
58	12	"Detention"	Jessica Landaw	Liz W. Garcia	January 15, 2006	2T6-362	14.61
59	13	"Debut"	Tim Hunter	Story by : Karin Lewicki & Kate Purdy; Teleplay by : Karin Lewicki	January 29, 2006	2T6-363	16.51
60	14	"Dog Day Afternoons"	Craig Ross Jr.	Sean Whitesell	February 26, 2006	2T6-364	14.56
61	15	"Sanctuary"	Alex Zakrzewski	Steve Sharlet	March 12, 2006	2T6-365	15.05
62	16	"One Night"	Nicole Kassell	Veena Cabreros Sud	March 19, 2006	2T6-366	14.62
63	17	"Superstar"	Bill Eagles	Story by : Craig O'Neill & Jason Tracey and Patricia Fullerton & Nancy Pinkston; Teleplay by : Craig O'Neill & Jason Tracey	March 26, 2006	2T6-367	14.64
64	18	"Willkommen"	Paris Barclay	Andrea Newman	April 2, 2006	2T6-368	12.27
65	19	"Beautiful Little Fool"	Kevin Bray	Liz W. Garcia	April 9, 2006	2T6-369	13.22
66	20	"Death Penalty: Final Appeal"	Alex Zakrzewski	Sean Whitesell	April 16, 2006	2T6-370	13.64
67	21	"The Hen House"	David Von Ancken	Craig Turk	April 30, 2006	2T6-371	14.10
68	22	"The River"	Craig Ross Jr.	Tyler Bensinger	May 7, 2006	2T6-372	14.61
69	23	"Joseph"	Roxann Dawson	Liz W. Garcia & Andrea Newman	May 21, 2006	2T6-373	13.09

=== Season 4 (2006–07) ===
No. overall	No. in season	Title	Directed by	Written by	Original release date	Prod. code	US viewers (millions)
70	1	"Rampage"	Mark Pellington	Veena Cabreros Sud	September 24, 2006	2T7901	16.27
71	2	"The War at Home"	Alex Zakrzewski	Samantha Howard Corbin	October 1, 2006	2T7904	14.44
72	3	"Sandhogs"	David Von Ancken	Greg Plageman	October 8, 2006	2T7903	13.73
73	4	"Baby Blues"	David Barrett	Liz W. Garcia	October 15, 2006	2T7902	13.97
74	5	"Saving Sammy"	Paris Barclay	Tyler Bensinger	October 22, 2006	2T7905	14.81
75	6	"Static"	Kevin Bray	Gavin Harris	October 29, 2006	2T7906	14.16
76	7	"The Key"	David Barrett	Jennifer M. Johnson	November 5, 2006	2T7907	13.96
77	8	"Fireflies"	Marcos Siega	Erica Shelton	November 12, 2006	2T7908	14.77
78	9	"Lonely Hearts"	John Peters	Liz W. Garcia	November 19, 2006	2T7909	14.53
79	10	"Forever Blue"	Jeannot Szwarc	Tom Pettit	December 3, 2006	2T7910	14.11
80	11	"The Red and the Blue"	Steve Boyum	Meredith Stiehm	December 10, 2006	2T7911	14.05
81	12	"Knuckle Up"	David Barrett	Greg Plageman	January 7, 2007	2T7912	14.12
82	13	"Blackout"	Seith Mann	Tyler Bensinger	January 14, 2007	2T7913	14.53
83	14	"8:03 AM"	Alex Zakrzewski	Veena Cabreros Sud	January 28, 2007	2T7914	15.13
84	15	"Blood on the Tracks"	Kevin Bray	Gavin Harris	February 18, 2007	2T7915	11.60
85	16	"The Good-Bye Room"	Holly Dale	Jennifer M. Johnson	March 4, 2007	2T7916	13.14
86	17	"Shuffle, Ball Change"	Mark Pellington	Liz W. Garcia	March 11, 2007	2T7917	15.45
87	18	"A Dollar, a Dream"	Chris Fisher	Erica Shelton	March 18, 2007	2T7918	15.09
88	19	"Offender"	David Barrett	Greg Plageman	March 25, 2007	2T7919	13.91
89	20	"Stand Up and Holler"	John Peters	Kate Purdy	April 1, 2007	2T7920	13.23
90	21	"Torn"	Kevin Bray	Tyler Bensinger	April 8, 2007	2T7921	11.33
91	22	"Cargo"	Andy García	Tom Pettit	April 15, 2007	2T7922	12.20
92	23	"The Good Death"	Paris Barclay	Gavin Harris	April 29, 2007	2T7923	12.14
93	24	"Stalker"	Alex Zakrzewski	Veena Cabreros Sud & Liz W. Garcia	May 6, 2007	2T7924	13.70

=== Season 5 (2007–08) ===
No. overall	No. in season	Title	Directed by	Written by	Original release date	Prod. code	US viewers (millions)
94	1	"Thrill Kill"	Alex Zakrzewski	Veena Cabreros Sud	September 23, 2007	3T6351	12.75
95	2	"That Woman"	Roxann Dawson	Liz W. Garcia	September 30, 2007	3T6352	13.71
96	3	"Running Around"	Holly Dale	Jennifer M. Johnson	October 7, 2007	3T6353	13.02
97	4	"Devil Music"	Chris Fisher	Kate Purdy	October 14, 2007	3T6354	13.88
98	5	"Thick As Thieves"	Holly Dale	Christopher Silber	October 21, 2007	3T6355	11.69
99	6	"Wunderkind"	Kevin Bray	Greg Plageman	October 28, 2007	3T6356	11.78
100	7	"World's End"	Roxann Dawson	Gavin Harris	November 4, 2007	3T6357	13.89
101	8	"It Takes a Village"	Kevin Bray	Erica Shelton	November 11, 2007	3T6358	12.78
102	9	"Boy Crazy"	Holly Dale	Joanna Lovinger	November 18, 2007	3T6359	14.12
103	10	"Justice"	Agnieszka Holland	Veena Cabreros Sud	November 25, 2007	3T6360	12.98
104	11	"Family 8108"	Jeannot Szwarc	Kellye Garrett & Elizabeth Randall	December 9, 2007	3T6361	11.57
105	12	"Sabotage"	Nicole Kassell	Greg Plageman	January 6, 2008	3T6362	10.96
106	13	"Spiders"	John Peters	Liz W. Garcia	February 17, 2008	3T6363	9.58
107	14	"Andy in C Minor"	Jeannot Szwarc	Gavin Harris	March 30, 2008	3T6364	9.80
108	15	"The Road"	Holly Dale	Jennifer M. Johnson	April 6, 2008	3T6365	11.93
109	16	"Bad Reputation"	Alex Zakrzewski	Christopher Silber	April 13, 2008	3T6366	9.43
110	17	"Slipping"	Kevin Bray	Erica Shelton	April 27, 2008	3T6367	11.62
111	18	"Ghost of My Child"	Roxann Dawson	Liz W. Garcia	May 4, 2008	3T6368	11.56

=== Season 6 (2008–09) ===
No. overall	No. in season	Title	Directed by	Written by	Original release date	Prod. code	US viewers (millions)
112	1	"Glory Days"	Roxann Dawson	Gavin Harris	September 28, 2008	3T7151	11.36
113	2	"True Calling"	Paris Barclay	Christopher Silber	October 5, 2008	3T7152	11.10
114	3	"Wednesday's Women"	John Finn	Erica Shelton	October 12, 2008	3T7153	10.99
115	4	"Roller Girl"	Holly Dale	Elle Triedman	October 19, 2008	3T7154	11.29
116	5	"Shore Leave"	Alex Zakrzewski	Elwood Reid	October 26, 2008	3T7155	11.97
117	6	"The Dealer"	Chris Fisher	Greg Plageman	November 2, 2008	3T7156	11.66
118	7	"One Small Step"	David Von Ancken	Taylor Elmore	November 9, 2008	3T7157	12.69
119	8	"Triple Threat"	Kevin Bray	Kathy Ebel	November 16, 2008	3T7158	12.28
120	9	"Pin Up Girl"	Chris Fisher	Gavin Harris	November 23, 2008	3T7159	12.15
121	10	"Street Money"	Carlos Avila	Christopher Silber	November 30, 2008	3T7160	11.52
122	11	"Wings"	David Von Ancken	Jennifer M. Johnson	December 21, 2008	3T7161	12.01
123	12	"Lotto Fever"	Agnieszka Holland	John Brian King	January 4, 2009	3T7162	12.67
124	13	"Breaking News"	Holly Dale	Erica Shelton	January 11, 2009	3T7163	12.30
125	14	"The Brush Man"	Roxann Dawson	Elwood Reid	January 25, 2009	3T7164	13.26
126	15	"Witness Protection"	Alex Zakrzewski	Elle Triedman	February 15, 2009	3T7165	10.89
127	16	"Jackals"	Marcos Siega	Taylor Elmore	March 8, 2009	3T7166	12.62
128	17	"Officer Down"	Alex Zakrzewski	Christopher Silber	March 15, 2009	3T7167	13.03
129	18	"Mind Games"	Donald Thorin, Jr.	Gavin Harris	March 22, 2009	3T7168	11.41
130	19	"Libertyville"	Marcos Siega	Kathy Ebel	March 29, 2009	3T7169	11.86
131	20	"Stealing Home"	Kevin Bray	Danny Pino & Elwood Reid	April 12, 2009	3T7170	10.56
132	21	"November 22nd"	Jeannot Szwarc	Ryan Farley	April 26, 2009	3T7171	10.57
133	22	"The Long Blue Line"	Roxann Dawson	Jennifer M. Johnson & Greg Plageman	May 3, 2009	3T7172	12.46
134	23	"Into The Blue"	Jeannot Szwarc	Jennifer M. Johnson & Greg Plageman	May 10, 2009	3T7173	11.84

=== Season 7 (2009–10) ===
No. overall	No. in season	Title	Directed by	Written by	Original release date	Prod. code	US viewers (millions)
135	1	"The Crossing"	Alex Zakrzewski	Taylor Elmore	September 27, 2009	3X5451	9.19
136	2	"Hood Rats"	Chris Fisher	Elwood Reid	October 4, 2009	3X5452	10.05
137	3	"Jurisprudence"	Holly Dale	Christopher Silber	October 11, 2009	3X5453	7.87
138	4	"Soul"	John F. Showalter	Ryan Farley	October 25, 2009	3X5454	9.30
139	5	"WASP"	Chris Fisher	Denise Thé	November 1, 2009	3X5455	9.02
140	6	"Dead Heat"	Nathan Hope	Adam Glass	November 8, 2009	3X5456	8.17
141	7	"Read Between the Lines"	Kevin Bray	Erica L. Anderson	November 15, 2009	3X5457	9.59
142	8	"Chinatown"	David Von Ancken	Alicia Kirk	November 22, 2009	3X5458	9.55
143	9	"Forensics"	Holly Dale	Jerome Schwartz	December 6, 2009	3X5459	9.64
144	10	"Iced"	Peter Medak	Taylor Elmore	December 13, 2009	3X5460	10.30
145	11	"The Good Soldier"	Gwyneth Horder-Payton	Christopher Silber	January 10, 2010	3X5461	10.38
146	12	"The Runaway Bunny"	John Finn	Elwood Reid	January 17, 2010	3X5462	10.62
147	13	"Bombers"	Janice Cooke-Leonard	Gina Gionfriddo	February 14, 2010	3X5463	8.73
148	14	"Metamorphosis"	Chris Fisher	Adam Glass & Danny Pino	February 21, 2010	3X5464	8.81
149	15	"Two Weddings"	Nathan Hope	Meredith Stiehm	February 28, 2010	3X5465	9.83
150	16	"One Fall"	Don Thorin Jr.	Ryan Farley	March 14, 2010	3X5466	10.23
151	17	"Flashover"	Jeannot Szwarc	Greg Plageman	March 21, 2010	3X5467	9.43
152	18	"The Last Drive-In"	Chris Fisher	Elwood Reid	March 28, 2010	3X5468	10.32
153	19	"Bullet"	John F. Showalter	Christopher Silber	April 4, 2010	3X5469	10.10
154	20	"Free Love"	Jeffrey Hunt	Elwood Reid & Denise Thé	April 11, 2010	3X5470	9.86
155	21	"Almost Paradise"	Alex Zakrzewski	Christopher Silber & Adam Glass	May 2, 2010	3X5471	9.64
156	22	"Shattered"	Jeannot Szwarc	Greg Plageman & Elwood Reid	May 2, 2010	3X5472	10.02
