= Jared Hegwood =

American author

Jared Hegwood is an American author. He won the Joan Johnson award for fiction in 2007 for his short story "Valero", and has written for the United States Navy's Naval Oceanographic Office at the Stennis Space Center.

== Biography ==
Hegwood studied with the Barthelme brothers at the Center for Writers at the University of Southern Mississippi.

He has published fiction alongside Barry Hannah in The Yalobusha Review. He was, along with John Wang, Tao Lin, and Karin Lewicki, an early contributor to Juked.

He has been nominated for the Pushcart Prize. He is an English professor at Augusta University.

== Bibliography ==
=== Short fiction ===
- "Feral" in Manifest Review, November 2012
- "Intimacy" in Keyhole Magazine, Fall 2009
- "Tana" in The Inkling, September 2009.
- "Lately" in Night Train, June 2009.
- "Hugs" in Keyhole Magazine, May 2009.
- "Like Fish" in elimae, May 2009
- "Night Sea" in elimae, June 2008.
- "A Month of Sundays" in elimae, June 2008.
- "Baltimorean Abstruse" in The Yalobusha Review, 2006
- "Our Trap" in The Adirondack Review, Spring 2006
- "A Line of Spiders" in elimae, June 2005
- "Rubicon" in Juked, March 2005
- "Adjustments" in The Adirondack Review, Fall 2004
- "The New Father" in Juked, Sept. 2004
- "Waiting Waiting Waiting" in Juked, June 2004
- "Failure to Communicate" 3711 Atlantic, Summer 2004
- "Fifteen Minutes" Dicey Brown, Spring 2004
- "Yardwork" in Juked, Feb. 2004
- "The Zombies" in Über, Winter 2003
- "Because We’re Not Watching the World When We Need To" Dicey Brown, Winter 2003
- "We Have All Misunderstood Billy the Kid" in Juked, Jan. 2003
- "The Art of Dinner Conversation" in Juked, Sept. 2003
- "Maladroit" in Eyeshot, Fall 2003
- "Christmas with Cobra Commander" in Juked, April 2003
- "If You See Buddha in the Lane" in Product 18, Spring 2003
- "The Martini" in Juked, Jul. 2002
- "Hustle," Short Fiction Winner in Outsider Ink, Summer 2001
- "Hemorrhage" in Juked, Jun. 2001
- "How Terry Got Pink" in Juked, Feb. 2001
- "Exhausted with Jesus" in Juked, Feb. 2001
- "Gemini" in Juked, Nov. 2000
- "Going the Distance" in Juked, Apr.2000
- "TV Guide" in EyeCaramba, Spring 2000
- "At Work" in Juked, December 2000
- "Meat Sticks" in Waysouth: a Journal of Southern Thought, Spring 1999
- "Scene at Ward’s" in WaySouth: a Journal of Southern Thought, Fall 1998

=== Nonfiction ===
- "In Need of Minor Catastrophe" in Public Scrutiny, Spring 2004
- "How Irresponsible of Me" in Juked, Nov. 2003
- "Why I’ve Been Gone" in Juked, Jan. 2003
- "Half an Hour in a Major Bookstore Chain" in Juked, June 2001
- "’Smashmouth’ and Other Words" in Juked, Feb. 2001
- "Requiem for a Magazine Publisher" in Juked, Sept. 2000

== Awards and honors ==
- Winner, Joan Johnson Fiction Award 2007, "Velero"
- Nomination, Pushcart Prize 2006, "Baltimorean Abstruse"
- Honorable Mention, Garth A. Avant Fiction Award 2006
- Honorable Mention, Joan Johnson Fiction Award 2005
- Nomination, Pushcart Prize 2004, "Adjustments"
