= Alex Plank =

American actor

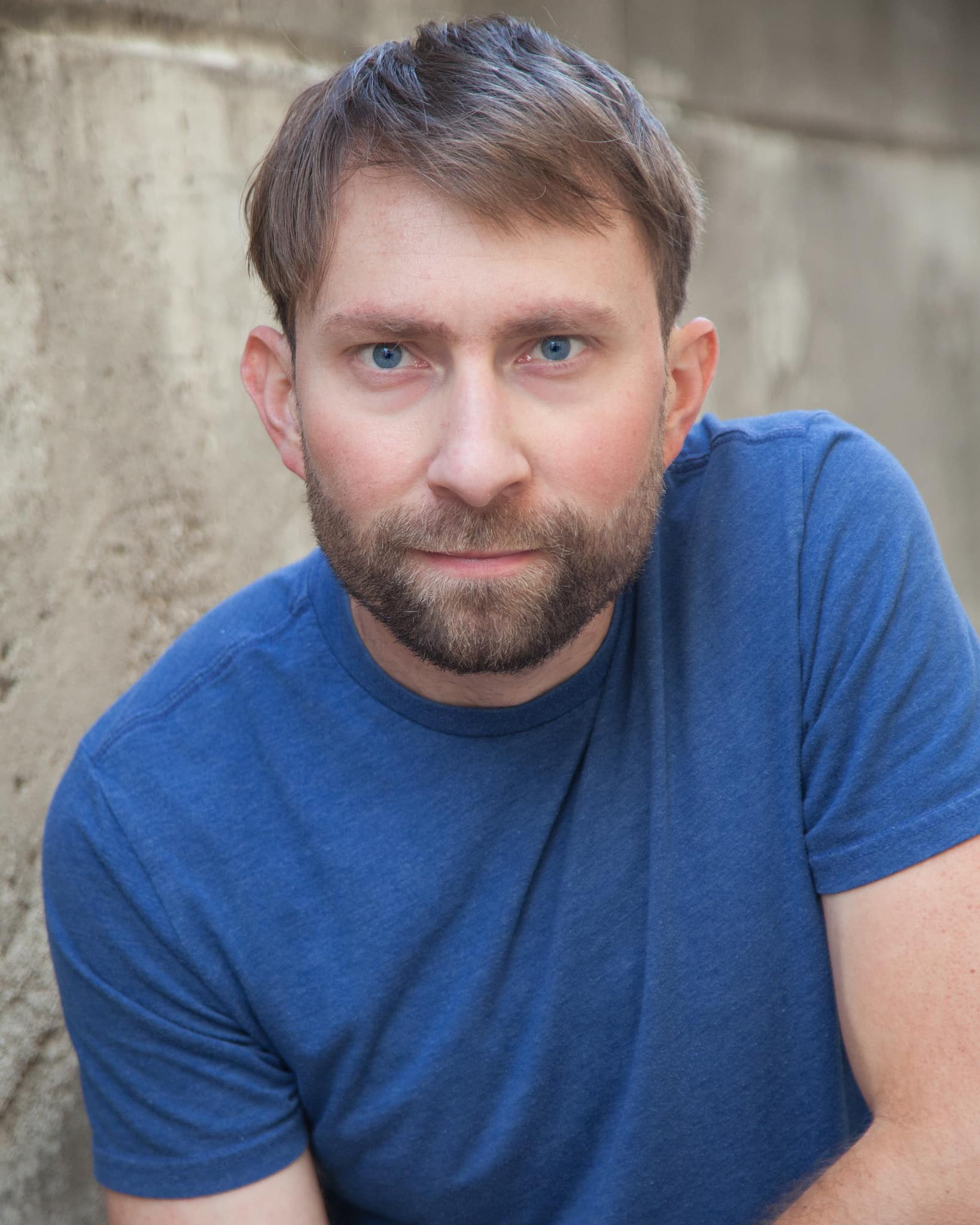
- Alex Plank
- Born: Alexander Plank; June 27, 1986 (age 40); Charlottesville, Virginia, U.S.
- Occupations: Autism advocate, film consultant, filmmaker, actor
- Known for: Creating Wrong Planet, consulting and acting on FX's The Bridge, acting on The Good Doctor

Alexander Plank (born June 27, 1986) is an American autistic activist, filmmaker and actor. He is known for founding the online community Wrong Planet, working on FX's television series The Bridge, and acting on The Good Doctor. At the age of 9, Plank was diagnosed with the now-defunct autism subtype Asperger syndrome. Plank started Wrong Planet at the age of 17 in order to find others like him on the Internet. After the popularity of Wrong Planet grew, Plank began to be frequently mentioned in the mainstream media in articles relating to autism, Asperger syndrome, and autistic rights.

== Early life and founding of Wrong Planet ==
As a child, Plank was bullied, excluded, and ridiculed by his peers, according to the book NeuroTribes. He only found out about his diagnosis of Asperger syndrome after looking through papers in his parents' drawers. During his teen years, he searched the internet to find others like him but was frustrated by the lack of sites for autistic individuals. He was a Linux developer while still in high school and was familiar with the tools needed to create an online community. After meeting Dan Grover, he created Wrong Planet at the age of 17.

Plank was a contributor to the online encyclopedia Wikipedia during its early years. He contributed to over 10,000 articles.

== Entertainment career ==
=== The Bridge ===
Plank served as a consultant for the 2013 TV series The Bridge and worked with Diane Kruger on developing her character. He made his on-screen acting debut in the finale of season one, playing the role of the intern at the El Paso Times. Kruger stated that Plank was on set every day and would collaborate with the show's writers, making "instrumental" contributions to her and the writers' work. Kruger also stated that, while working on the show, she spent more time with Plank than with her partner and friends. Plank introduced a variety of autistic tendencies into Kruger's character of Sonya Cross, including stimming, awkwardness around eye contact, and a flat affect.

The way in which Plank got hired to work on The Bridge was somewhat unconventional. He received an unsolicited call from an executive at FX who had heard of him. The executive proceeded to ask Plank questions about his experiences and his knowledge of autism. After this, Plank was contacted by the showrunner, Elwood Reid, who invited him to the writers room. It wasn't until after he met with Kruger that Plank was offered a full-time position on the show.

=== The Good Doctor ===
In 2019, Plank guest starred in season 2 of The Good Doctor as Javier Maldonado, the roommate of Lana Moore, a patient who needs to undergo brain surgery. While Javi initially denies being Lana's boyfriend, it is later revealed that they have a relationship that is more than platonic.

Plank's character's help is needed in the operating room to save Lana but Javi is sensitive to light (Plank wears progressively tinted glasses due to Javi's sensory processing disorder, a common condition comorbid to autism) and he refuses to help with the surgery. While Dr. Shaun Murphy, the show's autistic surgeon, tries to get Javi to overcome his fear by appealing to Javi's affinity for his ritual of playing insect trivia with Lana, Dr. Morgan Reznick appeals to Javi's emotions, insisting that Javi does indeed love Lana. But Javi replies that he does not love her. However, he later unexpectedly shows up during the surgery and saves Lana by overcoming his fear and going into the brightly lit operating room. After surgery, he confesses his love for her.

=== Filmography ===
Year	Title	Role	Notes
2013	The Bridge	Intern	Episode: "The Crazy Place"
2019	The Good Doctor	Javier Maldonado (Javi)	Episode: "Xin"
2023	Ezra	Dr. Kaplan	Also Associate Producer

== Other autism advocacy ==
In a 2008 interview with New York magazine, Plank claimed he was neither supportive of nor opposed to the idea of curing autism. Plank stated, "Since no cure exists, I don’t have to be opposed or for it. The thing now is to deal with the autistic people who are already on this planet."

Plank gave the keynote speech at the Autism Society of America's national conference in 2010. He also gave the keynote at the ASCEND conference in San Francisco. According to People Magazine, Plank spoke at a conference in San Diego during which he was also involved in the first "all-autism" wedding where he served as DJ and best man.

In 2010, Plank started an Internet television program called Autism Talk TV. The venture is sponsored by Autism Speaks. Rosie O'Donnell and John Elder Robison talked about the show on Rosie Radio. A front-page article from The New York Times, entitled "Navigating Love and Autism", written by Amy Harmon, was published in December 2011 about the romantic relationship between his two autistic co-hosts Jack Robison and Kirsten Lindsmith. Alex Plank, Wrong Planet, and Autism Talk TV were discussed.

Plank traveled to France in February 2012 to direct a documentary exposé, entitled Shameful, concerning the way in which autism is viewed and treated in France. When the film was in post-production it was covered by publications in both France and the United States, including L'Express and Vivre FM, a radio station in Paris; a trailer was released in July 2012.

Along with French activist David Heurtevent, Plank founded Autism Rights Watch, an NGO for which he serves as president.

== Controversies ==
=== 2005 shooting and 2006 lawsuit ===
In 2006, Wrong Planet was sued by the surviving family of two murder victims. The previous year, a 19-year-old user of the site, William Freund, shot the victims before killing himself in Aliso Viejo, California. Freund had e-mailed the site and posted messages in its forums, threatening violence and suicide. The plaintiffs claimed that Wrong Planet failed to take appropriate action to warn the victims, Freund's parents or police after the threats were made. Plank claimed that volunteer moderators unsuccessfully attempted to reach out to Freund's parents. Plank appeared on Good Morning America and Fox News discussing the incident.

=== Applied behavior analysis ===
In 2024, Plank directly responded to a critical video about Ezra (the 2023 film he co-produced) made by autistic content creator Jeremy Andrew Davis. In response to one of Davis' criticisms — that the film promoted the use of applied behavior analysis (ABA) on autistic people — Plank stated on social media that Ezra was intended to be anti-ABA and that he considered ABA to be a form of abuse. Davis apologized to Plank in a subsequent video and took down the original one.

ABA is a controversial operant-conditioning system commonly marketed as a treatment for autism and widely rejected within the autistic rights movement. Plank was a frequent guest on Autism Live, a promotional web show produced by the Center for Autism and Related Disorders (a firm that administers ABA and has claimed it can result in "recovery" from autism), from 2012 to 2021.
