= List of The Bridge (2013 TV series) episodes =

The Bridge is an American drama television series developed by Meredith Stiehm and Elwood Reid, based on the Danish/Swedish series Broen/Bron created by Hans Rosenfeld, Måns Mårlind and Björn Stein. It premiered on FX on July 10, 2013. The series was canceled after its second season. A total of 26 episodes aired over two seasons.

The series follows two police detectives – Marco Ruiz (Demián Bichir) and Sonya Cross (Diane Kruger) – and their joint effort to investigate a serial killer menacing both nations along the Texas–Chihuahua border. Their investigation is complicated by the rampant corruption and general apathy among the Mexican authorities and the violence of the powerful borderland drug cartels. The show's title refers to the Bridge of the Americas that serves as a border crossing between El Paso, Texas, and Ciudad Juárez, Chihuahua, where the series is set.

== Series overview ==
Season	Episodes	Originally released	
Season	Episodes	First released	Last released
1	13	July 10, 2013	October 2, 2013
2	13	July 9, 2014	October 1, 2014

== Episodes ==
=== Season 1 (2013) ===
No. overall	No. in season	Title	Directed by	Written by	Original release date	Prod. code	US viewers (millions)
1	1	"Pilot"	Gerardo Naranjo	Teleplay by : Meredith Stiehm & Elwood Reid	July 10, 2013	101	3.04
When the power is restored on the Bridge of the Americas, at the US-Mexican border, American Judge Lorraine Gates' body is found directly on the border line. Both El Paso Detective Sonya Cross (Diane Kruger) and Chihuahua Detective Marco Ruiz (Demián Bichir) arrive on the scene. Ruiz allows an ambulance with Charlotte Millwright (Annabeth Gish) and her husband (Robert R. Shafer), who is having a heart attack, to cross back into the States over Cross' objections. When Gates' body is moved, it comes apart at the waist, and the coroner identifies the upper part of the body as Gates', but the lower part belongs to Mexican Cristina Fuentes. Ruiz matches her with a previous case wherein 23 dismembered bodies were found in a "death house". Steven Linder (Thomas M. Wright) "kidnaps" Eva Guerra (Stephanie Sigman) near a night club in Mexico and takes her to a remote mobile home in Texas, where he temporarily holds her. The police identify the license plate of the bridge drop car, leading them to reporter Daniel Frye (Matthew Lillard). Frye is then trapped in his car with a timed device, leading him and police to suspect a bomb, but it turns out to be the timed release of a recorded message instead. After Charlotte's husband dies, she goes through his personal effects at their ranch, finding a password-protected cell phone and a key. She asks a ranch hand (Alejandro Patiño) about both the key and the phone. He doesn't know about the phone, but takes her to a remote cabin on the ranch where she finds a padlocked door in the cellar.
2	2	"Calaca"	Sergio Mimica-Gezzan	Elwood Reid	July 17, 2013	102	1.74
Marco reluctantly brings Sonya to the Mexican police headquarters to look into evidence concerning the dead Mexican girl and the 22 other bodies, but she quickly angers both Marco and the Captain when she begins inquiring into relatives of Fausto Galvan. Charlotte discovers a tunnel below the cabin on the ranch, and a lawyer visits her to tell her that her husband died with prior financial obligations. While investigating the crime at home, Sonya becomes distracted by her arousal and goes to a bar to invite a man back to her apartment to have sex with her. He then promptly leaves after she returns to work. There is no sign at the mobile home of Eva Guerra, and Linder starts burning her belongings, only to quickly retrieve her ringing cell phone from the fire. Illegal immigrants stumble on contaminated water in the desert near the US border. Maria, the only one who didn't drink the poisoned water, reaches a road and is picked up by a passerby. Frye publishes a story about the double homicide on the bridge; he then receives a call that leads him to the dead Mexican immigrants.
3	3	"Rio"	Charlotte Sieling	Meredith Stiehm	July 24, 2013	103	1.78
The self-proclaimed killer of the two bridge people, the nine Mexicans in the desert, and the abductor of Maria, tells Frye he will kill Maria unless he gets $1,000,000 from four rich Americans, including Charlotte's deceased husband. Charlotte goes to the El Paso police station to answer questions, including ones from Marco. Later, his family visits with him at the station, and he introduces them to Sonya. After the funeral, Charlotte has a discussion with her deceased husband's "business partner". When Charlotte refuses to deal with this woman, there are severe repercussions. When Marco visits with Charlotte, seeking her help in clarifying the circumstances surrounding his permitting her and her dying husband through the closed off crime scene on the bridge, they end up being intimate. While investigating the dead immigrants' crime scene, Sonya notices Linder's trailer in the distance and goes over to investigate. Marco and Sonya bring him in for questioning, but release him soon after. The man Sonya brought home from the bar comes to the precinct to ask for her phone number and invite her to dinner. Frye goes to Mexico, with fellow reporter Adriana Perez, to talk to the people behind the Mexican immigrant racket. The unidentified killer, who has Maria, ties her to stakes in the ground in the desert, and sets up a web feed to Frye's newspaper.
4	4	"Maria of the Desert"	Bill Johnson	Chris Gerolmo	July 31, 2013	104	1.75
Charlotte has now decided to open the tunnel between the ranch and Mexico, as the woman at the funeral demanded. Linder drops Eva off at a secluded house, telling her she will be safe there. The local Mexican drug lord, concerned about the beefed up border police security in the wake of Maria's kidnapping, uses the tunnel at Charlotte's ranch to bring ransom money from Mexico to Marco in El Paso, to save Maria. The FBI, involved because of the cross border link, takes the ransom money to the predetermined drop site. Sonya manages to identify where Maria is tied up in the hot desert, and with the help of her boss, rescues Maria in the nick of time. It's too late, though, to stop the money drop, and while Marco is tracking down the vanished FBI agent who has the money, he is ambushed by the killer.
5	5	"The Beast"	Gwyneth Horder-Payton	Esta Spalding	August 7, 2013	105	1.92
Cartel leader Fausto Galvan rationalizes that, even though he has killed many people, he doesn't enjoy it. That separates him from the killer in the news. He then goes into the back room, and shoots Hector's cousin dead. Sonya shows up at Marco's house to say she has intel on Agent Gedman. Gedman used to frequent Christina Fuentes on a weekly basis. During dinner with the family, she also tells Marco that Charlotte dropped his wallet off at the station. Later before bed, he puts his wallet on the bedside table, out of habit. Alma tells him to get out. Gina, booked on a shoplifting arrest, gets bailed out by her father. He won't let her stay with him, saying his girlfriend wouldn't like that. She says she will find her way home, only she goes to walk through the streets of Juárez. At the hospital, Maria is in and out of consciousness. Sonya wishes to question her, Frye wants to interview her, but the doctor tells them she is not ready. Hector startles Linder in his apartment, demanding to know where Eva is. They wrestle and Linder knocks him out. Suspicious of Linder, Marco knocks, seeking to ask him some questions, but Linder won't let him in. He then rolls Hector up in a blanket and tosses him out the window. Marco goes to question Frye and is able to steal his phone. Maria wakes and Marco tells her to not speak until given asylum. The killer phones Sonya to say he will be targeting institutions. She thinks of Gedman, whom the FBI has known about, as well as Christina's videos. At a coffee shop, Charlotte tells Marco about Graciella and the tunnel. He doesn't want to hear it. Gina is whisked away by a woman who shows her some pink crosses, and that "the Beast" killed all these girls, including her sister. This scares Gina in going home. Linder starts to bury Hector's body in the desert, when Galvan shows up to claim it. Sonya and Marco are given a file on Gedman, who was ordered to see psychologist Dr. Meadows. Sonya and Marco arrive at Meadow's house to find him with his throat slashed and a terrified Gina in a closet saying she has seen "the Beast".
6	6	"ID"	Alex Zakrzewski	Dario Scardapane	August 14, 2013	106	1.63
Charlotte and Ray have sex and she leads him through the tunnel on the property. Galvan and his henchman drag Hector Valdez's dead body past them. Marco, Sonya and Hank inspect the deceased Dr. Meadow's home. He died from a Colombian necktie. Sonya tries to question the only witness, Meadow's daughter Gina, who just wants to be left alone. At the station, Sonya shows her pictures of some of her father's patients, but she doesn't recognize anyone. Frye decides to go cold turkey, and Adriana suggests going to Juárez to find a connection in the murders. In Juárez, Frye and Adriana find Valdez's body ominously displayed. After looking through Dr. Meadow's files, Marco confronts Hank about his time as his patient. Hank tells him about a case where a young girl was raped and murdered and her younger sister had to identify the body. They caught the murderer, Jim Dobbs, but only after Hank shot him in the head during the pursuit. Dobbs lived but has a serious brain injury. The victim's little sister was Sonya. Since then, Hank feels an overwhelming responsibility toward her. Graciella meets Charlotte, who says Ray is now in control. Alma has lunch with her male coworker and he tries to kiss her. A sketch artist tries to draw Gina's fleeting glimpses of the killer. Hank suggests lunch and, at a diner, Gina excuses herself and climbs through a bathroom window. Sonya senses this and chases after her. She hears a scream and finds Gina in a pool of blood. The killer followed her and stabbed her. The wound is too severe to save her. Before dying, she tells Sonya that she got the eyes of the killer just right in the sketch. Marco goes his home, and Alma tells him to gather his things and get out. Sonya calls to tell him about Gina. The FBI didn't know about her, only their people. Someone is watching them. Ray calls Timmy about the new setup and asks for some supplies. Timmy is shown to be working with the ATF. Marco returns to Galvan the unused ransom, which was to be used to save the girl in the desert. He tells Galvan it was the right thing to do. Galvan reveals Marco's father's involvement in the drug trade. That life isn't for Marco, who refuses money offered him. Sonya visits Jim Dobbs in prison. His only means of communication is to draw pictures of a girl with blonde hair and a black mask covering her face.
7	7	"Destino"	Chris Fisher	Patrick Somerville	August 21, 2013	107	1.66
As part of the deal to unload the guns in the tunnel, Ray must perform oral sex on Graciella. Alma kicks Marco out of the house, not believing he didn't sleep with Sonya. She then goes to meet her new boyfriend at a hotel. Sonya traces the murderer's car to Jack Childress, who has a lot of guns in his house. Linder meets a woman in Juárez who gives him a mission. He must take her daughter Sara to Reverend Bob's ranch, only Sara is also Fausto Galvan's girlfriend. Hank and Cooper find Childress's car abandoned near a trailer park. Sonya, Marco, and Deputy Stokes join in the search. Stokes finds a bone saw as a neighbor says he thinks Childress is nearby. The man arrives and a shoot-out begins. Knowing his cell number, Sonya calls Childress and she learns he is right behind her. They both fire and she gets shot in her vest-covered chest. At the station, Marco thinks Childress is the killer. Sonya thinks the killer is more patient and calculating. Childress says he was only hired to kill "the Mexican".
8	8	"Vendetta"	Norberto Barba	Fernanda Coppel	August 28, 2013	108	1.77
In a flashback, Frye and Santi Jr. are out partying. They want to search for drugs, but Frye has lost his pants which has his passport. Santi Jr. goes off alone. In the present, Hank and Sonya question Jack Childress, who had shot her. He claims to not know about any dead women. Hank and the others are convinced he is the Bridge Butcher. Sonya doubts this. She looks for names connected to him. David Tate's is one of them. Marco says he worked with Tate on a task force, but he is dead now, committed suicide after his family was killed in a car wreck. Charlotte arrives home to find Timmy lounging by the pool. Ray offered to let him stay at the ranch. Ray delivers guns to Graciella, who pays him but later finds transmitters in the weapons. Sonya visits Tate's sister, who tells her his wife was having an affair with a Juárez man. She was leaving Tate and taking his son with her, only they were killed in Juárez on her way to see the man. Hank and Cooper find a body on Childress's property with a license identifying Ken Hastings. Alma and her new boyfriend attend a gala. Adriana arrives with Santi Jr. At the station, Sonya pulls up Hastings's driver's license and the picture is of Alma's boyfriend. Marco knows him as David Tate. At the club, Alma confesses to Tate that she is pregnant. He seems fine with the news. He wants to take her home, and she agrees to meet outside in five minutes. He goes to the restroom where he sees Santi Jr. He pulls out a knife and slits Santi Jr.'s throat, for he was the driver that caused the accident that killed Tate's family. Before Tate leaves, he leaves his bloody handprint for the police to find. Sonya, Marco and Hank arrive on the scene to find a bead on the body, just like at the other crime scenes. Marco recognizes it being from a necklace that belonged to a woman with whom he was having an affair. Marco tells Sonya that he had sex with Jill Tate. Alma rides away with David.
9	9	"The Beetle"	Keith Gordon	Elwood Reid	September 4, 2013	109	1.65
We see Tate reliving when he arrived at the accident that claimed his family. At the Santi Jr. crime scene, Marco tells her that he was a suspect in the Tate accident. She asks if Tate knew about the affair but Marco says no. She ponders if perhaps he didn't know back then, but does now. In the barn, Charlotte is attacked by Graciella and her henchman looking for Ray. Cesar arrives and shoots the henchman. Graciella is unmoved, threatening Cesar. Charlotte kills her with a pitchfork. Gus meets Zina, who he has been texting for weeks. However, she says they haven't communicated since she moved away, months ago. He has been getting texts from her old phone. Marco tells Sonya about Tate, who was working the lost girls of Juárez case until it was shut down. Tate's demeanor changed after the accident. His phone rings, showing Alma's number. Tate is on the other end and taunts him. Linder confesses to Reverend Bob about killing Hector. He also tells Eva, who is relieved at the news. Gus comes home and is asked about "Ken Hastings", whom he says works at the school with Alma and has been in the house. Marco and Sonya are called to Hastings's apartment, where surveillance pictures of Marco are found, as well as one of a cabin in the desert. The cabin is where Tate had taken Alma and the girls. He hands her a live grenade and locks them in the cabin. Gus tells Marco about the texts, and they are able to dupe Tate into a meeting. He arrives but leaves a note for Tate with coordinates to the cabin. Marco and Hank arrive at the cabin to save everyone. Marco calls Sonya to tell her to get Gus to a safe house. As they are driving, Tate slams into Sonya's car and drags Gus to his. She blacks out after getting his plate number.
10	10	"Old Friends"	Alex Zakrzewski	Patrick Somerville	September 11, 2013	110	1.80
Gus pleads with Tate from the backseat of his car, as emergency workers arrive to check on Sonya. She tells Hank the plate number of Tate's car. Frye is shamed that he was Tate's target and tells Adriana about the night Santi Jr. hit the car carrying Tate's wife and son. Santi Sr. gave Frye a job in order to keep him quiet. Marco tells Alma that she and the girls are being taken to a safe house. He adds that the affair with Tate's wife happened before meeting her. She doesn't care. Adriana attends an AA meeting with Frye. Alone outside, he is abducted by Tate. At the courthouse. Charlotte learns that she only got the ranch in her husband's will. Ray tells her they still have the tunnel and plenty to smuggle. Gus wakes up in a barrel that begins to fill with liquid. After Tate's car is found at a cemetery, Marco and Sonya get clues about Tate's uncle and visit his house. Tate calls Marco, telling him to leave Sonya and meet him. Charlotte and Ray learn Timmy is working for the ATF. She tells Ray to kill him, but she ends up being the one to shoot him. Marco and Tate discuss having sex with each other's wives. Marco pleads Gus's innocence and tries to strangle Tate, but cannot. He is told to ditch his phone as Tate drives on.
11	11	"Take the Ride, Pay the Toll"	John Dahl	Dario Scardapane & Elwood Reid	September 18, 2013	111	1.50
Ray drags Timmy's decomposing body through the tunnel and finds numerous dead bodies, shot in the midst of a card game. With one of the corpse's guns, he exchanges fire with a stranger and kills him. David Tate and Marco arrive at the Juárez/El Paso border. Tate tells Marco that his wife's death was instant but his son managed to live for ten minutes after the crash. He hoped that his son died quietly, but he thinks that Caleb actually suffered. Tate pulls in the middle of the bridge, near where his wife and son died. Tate, wired with explosives, and Marco exit the car. Tate shuts off all the lights, except theirs and orders Marco to open the trunk. Inside is Daniel Frye, alive and terrified. Hank arrives to find the stand-off. Tate wants Marco to shoot Frye and does it himself, when Marco balks. Sonya and Cooper find Gus in the barrel at Ray's uncle's house. She goes to the bridge to beg Marco not to shoot Tate, who reveals that Gus is dead. Sonya tries to convince Marco that Gus survived, but at Tate's taunting, Marco does not believe her. She must wound Marco by shooting him as Tate is taken into custody. Marco is furious with her for stopping him but is now lost without his son. Adriana checks on Frye in his hospital room. The doctor tells her he has massive head and spinal injuries.
12	12	"All About Eva"	SJ Clarkson	Esta Spalding & Fernanda Coppel	September 25, 2013	112	1.34
Linder shows up at Reverend Bob's ranch, ready to marry Eva, only to be told she isn't there. Eva leaves her factory job in Juárez, misses the bus home, and must take an offered ride in a car with Texas plates. Sonya is distraught when a mechanic tells her the Bronco, her sister's car, is a total loss. She visits Marco, who is in a disheveled state and doesn't care much about anything, including her. Charlotte meets Fausto Galvan at a carnival and she suggests teaming up. Linder speaks with Sonya about his "bride" Eva. He tells her he was told Eva had been gone for three days. In Juárez, Eva is taken to a jail cell by a cop and locked up. Sonya helps an angry and sad Marco cope with Gus' death and the loss of Alma and his daughters. Linder walks the streets of Juárez with Eva's picture. A woman tells him where he can look for the girl. Adriana takes a recovering Daniel to dinner with her family, only to storm out after an argument with her mother over being a lesbian. The cop takes Eva, drugged and beaten, to a large estate. Hank suggests to Marco that perhaps testifying against Tate might bring peace. At the courthouse, Tate smiles and nods at Marco. Celia later informs Marco that other women and girls have been trafficked through the department. Linder and other men and women dig in a field of pink crosses, which signify the lost girls of Juárez. There are many more left to be found.
13	13	"The Crazy Place"	Gwyneth Horder-Payton	Elwood Reid & Dario Scardapane	October 2, 2013	113	1.43
The cop, with an injured Eva in the car, meets a man who hands him a gun and tells him to get rid of her. The cop decides against it. Sonya asks Hank if he is retiring. He has the paperwork, but has not filled it out yet. She asks to work on the Dead Girls of Juárez case. Charlotte, Ray and Cesar meet with lawyer Monte about laundering the tunnel money. She asks advice for the dinner with Fausto Galvan. Daniel returns to work and is assigned a story about the 100th birthday of Millie Quintana. He and Adriana go to her house to find her dead and a large stash of cash in both dollars and Euros in her closet. Sonya and Celia find footage of the cop with Eva. Marco finds and beats the cop until he reveals Eva's location. Sonya and Marco find Eva in a monastery and help her back to the States. A strange man tells Charlotte that he knows all about her and that she should keep her meeting with Galvan. Sonya sympathizes with Marco, and she knows he won't seek revenge. Adriana returns home to hear from her mother that her sister, Daniela, never returned home. Marco visits Galvan to ask a favor. He wants Galvan to get him to David Tate so he can kill him himself.

=== Season 2 (2014) ===
No. overall	No. in season	Title	Directed by	Written by	Original release date	Prod. code	US viewers (millions)
14	1	"Yankee"	Keith Gordon	Elwood Reid	July 9, 2014	201	1.50
Marco is in Juárez, working for its police department and still coping with the death of his son and a pending divorce. During a raid, he gets deliberately shot at by a fellow police officer who then disappears. Frye and Adriana continue to search for her sister. In El Paso, Sonya gets called to the prison to learn Jim Dobbs is dying. There, she meets his brother, Jack, with whom she starts a sexual relationship and takes back to her house to have sex. Elsewhere, Hank's attempts to protect Eva fail when she recognizes Domingo, a Juárez policeman, staking out his farm. Hank arranges for her to return to live with Bob. The cartel sends their "fixer", Eleanor Nacht (Franka Potente), to El Paso. She leaves a trail of bodies behind her, which draws the attention of Hank and his team.
15	2	"Ghost of a Flea"	Daniel Sackheim	Story by : Elwood Reid; Teleplay by : Damien Cave & Elwood Reid	July 16, 2014	202	1.18
Hank and Sonya find the dead body of Eleanor's accomplice, as well as a stuffed dog, in a car circling in the desert. The dog is revealed to be a DEA K9 unit, and the decayed corpse of a DEA agent is found at the taxidermist. Joe Mackenzie and the DEA get involved in the investigation, hoping to tie the murders back to Fausto Galvan. In Juarez, Marco grows increasingly suspicious of his police department, and starts a fist fight with another cop at the station. Captain Robles then brings Marco to the home of Eleanor's murdered accomplice, where he meets with Galvan. In exchange for helping Marco avenge his son's death, Galvan demands that Marco inject himself into the hunt for Eleanor in El Paso. Marco visits Sonya and informs her of this development. After killing her accomplice, Eleanor has enlisted the aid of Kyle, a teenage El Paso boy whom she seduces and murders.
16	3	"Sorrowsworn"	Stefan Schwartz	Dario Scardapane	July 23, 2014	203	1.29
While Eleanor disposes of Kyle's body at a former butterfly sanctuary, Marco is cleared to work with Sonya on the case. They interview Dex, Kyle's friend who fled upon first seeing Eleanor. Agent Mackenzie informs them about Eleanor's past – she is a shunned Mennonite who now works for Galvan's cartel, which Mackenzie is reluctant to reveal after seeing Marco. Frye and Adriana visit Raul Quintana to tell him about Chuchito's death. Raul tells them Chuchito was seen with a woman from the cartel. After Ray and Cesar are hijacked by a gang who take the drugs, Ray suggests to Charlotte that they go into hiding. Steven Linder arrives at Reverend Bob's ranch. Eva is there; Domingo is also being held captive there by Bob. Steven asks her to confide in him and then attacks Domingo. Eleanor visits Dex in his bedroom and prepares to take him to see Kyle. However, he appears more innocent than Kyle, and she leaves after telling him Kyle is "with the butterflies". He tells Marco and Sonya this, and she knows where Kyle could be. They find his body in a barrel at the sanctuary, while Eleanor watches from a distance.
17	4	"The Acorn"	Colin Bucksey	Patrick Somerville	July 30, 2014	204	1.13
After Jonathan DeLarge, a banker that Eleanor previously threatened, makes a call on one of his many burner phones, Adriana and Frye meet him in an attempt to learn why he is laundering money for the cartel. When they leave, he commits suicide. Sonya checks his phones to find he called the Clio corporation, an odd business for him to call. There, she is given the company's phone records, while Marco talks with the CEO, Sebastian Cerisola, revealed to be a cartel member who tells him they have Eleanor. Eleanor is taken to meet Galvan, and they discuss their pre-arranged deal before she speaks with someone being held in a cell. Meanwhile, Ray and Charlotte discuss hiding out in Alaska, before Monte Flagman arrives to tell them they are needed for a job. Steven continues torturing Domingo and asks for the names of those there the night Eva was raped. Elsewhere, Jim Dobbs dies and Jack takes his drawings before Sonya arrives. Jack later visits her home and steals another drawing.
18	5	"Eye of the Deep"	Alex Zakrzewski	Mauricio Katz	August 6, 2014	205	0.93
With a guard's help, David Tate is assaulted in prison and his left eye is cut out. Galvan tells Marco that the time has come for his revenge on Tate, if he still seeks it. Marco agrees and is smuggled into the prison on a food supply truck. Meanwhile, Juárez prosecutor Abelardo Pintado, Sonya, and Hank visit the ranch to show Eva pictures of Juárez policemen. She identifies Domingo and Captain Robles as her assailants. After Agent Mackenzie is told by the CIA to not investigate the Clio company's ties to the cartel, he tells Frye to check out the company. When Jack tells Sonya that Jim will be cremated without ceremony, she asks to attend. She leaves for work, and he studies her family pictures and Jim's drawings. Later, Sonya asks for Jim's remains when Jack refuses them. Monte takes Ray and Charlotte to a housing development, where Eleanor previously killed the developer, and tells them they must now run it. The bicycle gang that robbed Cesar and Ray are all murdered by Galvan's men except for one that survives. The men also leave a sign from Galvan. At the prison, Marco is given a shiv and escorted to the infirmary, where Tate is recovering. Tate tells him to finish it, but Marco only further injures him for now.
19	6	"Harvest of Souls"	Guy Ferland	Evan Wright	August 13, 2014	206	0.82
Jack's deciphering of Jim's drawings leads him to dig under a water tower, where he finds human remains. He later tells Sonya that he went hiking at a place Jim used to take him. They discuss Jim's ashes and ultimately put the container in a dumpster. She then gives him a key to her place, but states that she isn't his girlfriend. When the former housing developer tips them off about meeting with Eleanor, Sonya and Hank find an empty house, but she wonders how this, the bank, and Eleanor all tie together. Blindfolded, Frye and Adriana meet with the hitman who killed Chuchito and Raul Quintana. He then names Cerisola. The reporters go to interview Cerisola but leave when he doesn't show. Cerisola then has Adriana investigated. She is reluctant to publish the story, but agrees when Frye talks her into it. His editor fires him, fearing the repercussions of naming Cerisola. At the ranch, Eva hears Domingo in the shed and recognizes him. She is furious with Steven for not telling her. When Pintado is killed in a staged traffic accident, she kills Domingo with an ax, after he claims her rape has made her a whore. Sonya and Marco believe the prosecutor hid Eva's deposition and find it in a motel room. Two policemen arrive and engage in a shootout with them. Sonya wounds one, and Marco forces her to leave, so he can "finish it". From the hall, she hears two shots fired.
20	7	"Lamia"	Adam Arkin	Dre Alvarez & Anna Fishko	August 20, 2014	207	0.94
After having a bender with his tech friend/AA sponsor Gary (Brian Baumgartner), Frye gains access to the Texas Secretary of State's website, where he and Adriana learn that Grupo Clio made payments from DeLarge's bank, following his death, to the real estate developer. They question Ray, who ends the discussion when he learns they are reporters, but not until after Adriana gives him a business card. He and Charlotte gives the card to Eleanor and asks for payment. She tells them, speaking in third-person narrative, about Galvan helping her get revenge on her father, who raped her as a teenager, the same man now being kept in a cage. Later, Adriana comes home to find that her girlfriend Lucy has been stabbed and has killed her attacker. Agent Mackenzie approaches Charlotte to ask what she knows about Galvan. Sonya goes with Jack to the water tower, where he shows her the remains of Bridget Rowland, a girl Jim killed two years before he killed Sonya's sister, Lisa. Hank and the team are called to the scene, and he attacks Jack. If Jack knew of Bridget's murder, he could have told someone and, thus, prevented Lisa's death. Jack counters, saying Hank killed Jim, who was unarmed. Sonya doesn't trust either Jack nor Hank, walking out on Hank's apology and later taking her key back from Jack. She then takes Bridget's purse to her mother. After being cleared for the shooting, Marco is hailed as a hero. He refuses to accept the honor, until Robles mentions revealing Sonya's involvement. Marco threatens to show the deposition should anything happen to her or Eva. Galvan later reminds Marco that Tate is still alive. Marco says Tate needs to stay alive and suffer. At the prison, Tate is strapped down, a long tube is inserted into his nostril, and fluid from a syringe is injected into it. After a violent seizure, he stops shaking.
21	8	"Goliath"	Jakob Verbruggen	Elwood Reid & Dario Scardapane	August 27, 2014	208	0.95
Sonya visits her mother, now a homeless drug addict, and leaves her a token from Lisa, saying "it's over". Shortly thereafter, Eleanor takes this token from Sonya's mother. Agent Mackenzie picks up Sonya and reveals Marco's culpability in David Tate's murder, suggesting Marco is a mole for Galvan. Sonya subsequently confronts Hank with this knowledge, though Hank is steering clear of the El Paso department until the Dobbs case is solved. Galvan hires a mysterious gringo hitman, the "Chopper", to kill Sonya. Cerisola, fed up with Galvan's instinctive violence, sets him up for arrest. He tries to sway Eleanor to his side, but Eleanor refuses, as Galvan has the one thing she wants - her captive father. Marines raid Galvan's warehouse, encountering Eleanor's father in the tunnels underneath. Frye confronts Cerisola at his son's school, and is arrested by Mexican police, who leave him in a cell with detoxing junkies. Adriana goes to Marco to have Frye released. Marco subsequently goes to Sonya with new information from the reporters, but Sonya rejects him, accusing him of collaborating with Galvan. Eva leads Linder to one of her rapists; Linder kills the man in front of his mother. While fleeing through a series of tunnels, Galvan kills two of his henchmen based on a gut feeling. Sonya is ambushed in her home by the Chopper, who knocks her unconscious.
22	9	"Rakshasa"	Guillermo Navarro	Marisha Mukerjee	September 3, 2014	209	1.19
Marco bails out Cerisola's daughter Romina on a drug charge in exchange for information. Cerisola reveals that Fausto hired a hitman to eliminate Sonya. His hitman, The Chopper, drives Sonya out to the desert, where he ties her legs and lets try to flee, knowing she won't be able to escape him. Sonya flees into the desert, but collapses from heat exhaustion. Marco follows The Chopper's trail and finds him digging a grave; assuming Sonya is already dead, Marco shoots the man, killing him. Following Sonya's voice, he is able to rescue her. Sonya, however, is still suspicious of Marco, especially upon learning that he got her location from Cerisola. Eleanor, figuring out there's a rat in the organization, suspects Chip the realtor. She brings Cesar and her henchman Jaime to the property at Red Ridge, bringing Charlotte as well. There, Cesar smothers Chip with a plastic bag. Charlotte, fearing that Eleanor is on to her, texts Agent Mackenzie, who prepares for an ambush, along with his partner and Hank. However, Fausto, also suspicious of Eleanor's betrayal, has ordered his men to kill everyone at Red Ridge. Fausto's men arrive just after the police, killing Charlotte and the DEA agents, and wounding Hank. In the aftermath, Cesar mourns Charlotte's death, and Hank flees the house, leaving a trail of blood.
23	10	"Eidolon"	Colin Bucksey	Patrick Somerville	September 10, 2014	210	1.28
Eleanor kills her driver for peeking in her ledger which leads to him having the car stuck in drive, which is the circling car Sonya and Hank come across in the second episode. Monte arrives at Red Ridge (same scene as the first scene of the season) after the shoot out and finds Eleanor but can't find Hank. Sonya and Marco arrive at Red Ridge to find the bloodbath as well, finding DEA officers dead and even Charlotte. Hank is on the move, crawling his way through the sand but is accidentally leaving blood trails which makes his escape an unsuccessful one. On top of this all he knows the location of Eleanor's ledger, meanwhile Monte hires a doctor to secretly work on Eleanor's wounds and also helps keep Hank alive to hear the ledger's whereabouts in a random abandoned factory. Sonya and Marco locate and find them leaving the factory to chase them down and crash into Eleanor's car. Sonya holds a gun on Eleanor as she slowly struggles to walk away, Eleanor turns to Sonya and drops to the ground.
24	11	"Beholder"	John Dahl	Mauricio Katz & Evan Wright	September 17, 2014	211	1.22
Galvan, knowing that both Eleanor and Cerisola have turned against him, abducts Cerisola's daughter, strings her out on bad heroin, and records a threatening video to send to Cerisola. Sonya is not allowed to question Eleanor, as it now a federal case for both the DEA and the CIA. However, Hank recovers in the hospital enough to tell her that he hid Eleanor's ledger while fleeing the shootout. She finds it, with the token inside, and convinces Cooper to sneak her in to briefly question Eleanor before getting caught. Meanwhile, Frye and Adriana investigate the CIA's involvement, and Eva and Linder stake out Captain Robles' residence. She also convinces him to shave off his beard, despite his belief that it empowers him. Marco meets with some Marines in an attempt to infiltrate Galvan's hideaway. However, he is captured near the gate.
25	12	"Quetzalcoatl"	Jakob Verbruggen	Dario Scardapane & Adam Gaines	September 24, 2014	212	1.03
Galvan questions Marco about the deal made with the Marines, then puts him in a barn with Cerisola's daughter. Galvan finds a phone that communicates with the Marines and is told he may pass their checkpoint. The Marines fire upon the approaching vehicle but learn it is a decoy. Galvan and his captives escape into the mountains that he knows very well. Sonya and Hank try to track Eleanor, who has been taken by the CIA from police custody. She is actually set free to learn more about Cerisola's plan for Galvan, and vice versa. Linder makes his move on Robles, tracking him to a trucking company run by the cartel. However, after seeing off a transport truck, Robles shoots him as he approaches from behind. Elsewhere, Sonya and Hank witness a driver exchange for the truck, and each follow the respective targets.
26	13	"Jubilex"	John Dahl	Elwood Reid	October 1, 2014	213	1.03
Hank gets into a shootout with the truck driver, killing him. In the trailer, he follows a blood trail to find Linder. As Linder is taken away by ambulance, Hank shows a federal investigator the trailer's cargo: an estimated ten tons of heroin. Meanwhile, Sonya follows her driver to a house, hears a gunshot and goes inside, only to be knocked out by CIA Agent Buckley, who has just come from warning Frye to drop the story and burning Mackenzie's files. Sonya recovers and calls Hank. Elsewhere, after completing her agreement with Cerisola, Eleanor is allowed access to her father. Frye and Adriana have a meeting with Buckley's superior, who tells them that he is a rogue agent and that he's been dealt with. In the mountains, Galvan leads Romina and Marco on a lengthy journey, causing her to collapse from detox exhaustion. When Galvan tries to inject heroin to her, she instead injects Galvan with the drug, allowing Marco to gain an advantage; however, Galvan shoots Romina during the struggle. Galvan leads them to a truck, which has become disabled over time. Marco phones Sonya for a ride. Romina is taken to a hospital and Sonya stays to watch over her, while Marco takes Galvan to the Juárez jail. He becomes Galvan's personal handler, even shirking off Robles's help and the prosecutor's offer to be the new police chief. Buckley is shot and killed by a hitman he intended to send after Frye and Adriana. Eleanor takes her father to an acorn tree to tell him what she experienced when he raped her there for the first time. She gives him the opportunity to touch her, and, although tethered, he overpowers her. Sonya, who has spoken to Cerisola in the hospital, saves her by shooting her father. Sonya calls Marco, and, even though he thinks both father and daughter should have killed each other, he tells Sonya that Eleanor will be protected.
