= Juked =

- Editor: J. W. Wang
- Categories: Literary magazine
- Frequency: Annually
- Founded: 1999
- First issue: 1999
- Country: United States
- Based in: Los Angeles
- Website: juked.com

Juked is an American literary magazine established in 1999 by J. W. Wang (Los Angeles). Print editions have been published yearly since 2003. Notable contributors include Blake Butler, Tao Lin, Jared Hegwood, Karin Lewicki, Woody Evans, Stephen Graham Jones, Kim Chinquee, Ashley Farmer, Jackson Bliss, Claudia Smith, and others. "Moment" is a photo-essay feature of Juked.

== Recognition ==
Stories and essays published in Juked have been anthologized in W. W. Norton & Company's New Sudden Fiction, Best New Poets, Dzanc Books' Best of the Web, and elsewhere.

== See also ==
- List of literary magazines
