= Woody Evans =

American librarian and author

- Born: 1977 (age 48–49); Mississippi, United States
- Occupations: Writer, librarian
- Writing career
- Period: 1999–

K. Durwood "Woody" Evans is an American librarian and author of short stories and nonfiction works, who is known for critical commentary on technology, technoculture, and transhumanism. He has written for Rain Taxi, Boing Boing, Juked, Blunderbuss Magazine, was a Library Journal columnist in 2007, and is a frequent contributor to Information Today publications. His books and articles are referenced in Library and Information Science courses.

== Partial bibliography ==
=== Fiction ===
- Bastard Sword. Split Lip Magazine, 2016.
- Sirius Numb. Blunderbuss Magazine, 2016.
- Pashtun Probs. Blip Magazine, 2012.
- Eyes Only. TRNSFR, 2011
- The Devil Plus Russians. Primal, 1999.

=== Poetry ===
- Locusts Throng the Corn. Tanka Journal, 2016
- The Dowager's Goat. Haiku Journal, 2013
- Buildup. Juked, 2004

=== Nonfiction ===
- Them Skulls. Star 82 Review, 2018.
- Cyberspace is the Child of the Industrial Age – Defining it as Independent is Nonsense. Institute for Ethics and Emerging Technologies, 2016.
- Against Transhuman Separatism. Institute for Ethics and Emerging Technologies, 2016.
- Librarians Need Global Credentials. Library Journal. 2016: 54. 1 April.
- FreakAngels. Rain Taxi Review of Books, 2012.
- Outside the Gold Ring: Notes from the First Ever Middle East Film and Comic Con. Motherboard, 2012.
- The Social Web and Civil Life. Searcher, 2009

=== Books ===
- Building Library 3.0. Chandos, 2009.
- Information Dynamics in Virtual Worlds. Chandos, 2011
- The Future We Deserve. (Contributor). 2011.
