= Michael Klick =

American film producer (1948–2025)

Michael Klick (February 20, 1948 – August 10, 2025) was an American television producer.

== Life and career ==
Klick was born on February 20, 1948. He won his first Emmy Award in 2006 as a producer on 24. He won a second Emmy Award in 2012 as executive producer for Homeland.

In 2023, he served as the executive producer of Love & Death.

Klick died at home in Los Angeles on August 10, 2025, at the age of 77.
