= Homeland (TV series) =

American political thriller television series (2011–2020)

- Genre: Drama; Espionage thriller; Psychological thriller; Political thriller
- Based on: Prisoners of War (Israel) by Gideon Raff
- Developed by: Howard Gordon; Alex Gansa
- Showrunner: Alex Gansa
- Starring: Claire Danes; Damian Lewis; Morena Baccarin; David Harewood; Diego Klattenhoff; Jackson Pace; Morgan Saylor; Mandy Patinkin; Jamey Sheridan; David Marciano; Navid Negahban; Rupert Friend; Sarita Choudhury; Tracy Letts; F. Murray Abraham; Nazanin Boniadi; Laila Robins; Sebastian Koch; Miranda Otto; Alexander Fehling; Sarah Sokolovic; Elizabeth Marvel; Maury Sterling; Linus Roache; Jake Weber; Morgan Spector; Costa Ronin; Nimrat Kaur; Numan Acar
- Composer: Sean Callery
- Country of origin: United States
- Original language: English
- No. of seasons: 8
- No. of episodes: 96 (list of episodes)

Production
- Executive producers: Alex Gansa; Howard Gordon; Gideon Raff; Michael Cuesta; Avi Nir; Ran Telem; Henry Bromell; Alexander Cary; Chip Johannessen; Meredith Stiehm; Lesli Linka Glatter; Patrick Harbinson; Michael Klick; Claire Danes; Ron Nyswaner; Debora Cahn
- Producers: Lauren White; Katie O'Hara; Charlotte Stoudt; Mandy Patinkin; Sunday Stevens
- Production locations: Charlotte, North Carolina, U.S. (seasons 1–3); Tel Aviv, Israel (seasons 1–2); Old San Juan, Puerto Rico (season 3); Morocco (seasons 3, 6, 8); Cape Town, South Africa (season 4); Berlin, Germany (season 5); New York City, U.S. (season 6); Richmond, Virginia, U.S. (season 7); Budapest, Hungary (season 7); Los Angeles, U.S. (season 8)
- Cinematography: Nelson Cragg; Chris Manley; David Klein; Giorgio Scali; Peter Levy
- Editors: Joe Hobeck; Terry Kelley; Jordan Goldman; David Latham; Garret Donnelly; Michael Ruscio; Harvey Rosenstock; Philip Carr Neel; Sarah Zeitlin; Victoria Grimsley
- Camera setup: Single-camera
- Running time: 45–85 minutes
- Production companies: Teakwood Lane Productions; Cherry Pie Productions; Keshet Studios; Fox 21 Television Studios (Note: Credited as Fox 21 for first four seasons); Showtime Networks; Studio Babelsberg

Original release
- Network: Showtime
- Release: October 2, 2011 – April 26, 2020

Homeland (stylized as HOMƎLAND) is an American espionage thriller television series developed by Howard Gordon and Alex Gansa. It is based on the Israeli series Prisoners of War, created by Gideon Raff, who also serves as an executive producer on Homeland. The series stars Claire Danes as Carrie Mathison, a CIA officer with bipolar disorder, convinced that decorated Marine Corps scout sniper Nicholas Brody (Damian Lewis) was "turned" by al-Qaeda and poses a threat to the United States. The series storyline grows from that premise, together with Mathison's ongoing covert work.

The series was broadcast in the United States on cable channel Showtime, and was produced by Fox 21 Television Studios (formerly Fox 21). It premiered on October 2, 2011. The first episode was made available online more than two weeks before the television broadcast, with viewers having to complete game tasks to gain access. The series' eighth and final season premiered on February 9, 2020. The finale aired on April 26, 2020.

The series received largely positive reviews, with its first two seasons gaining near-universal praise. It won several awards, including the 2011 and 2012 Golden Globe Award for Best Television Series – Drama for its first two seasons, and the 2012 Primetime Emmy Award for Outstanding Drama Series for its first season. Danes won the Primetime Emmy Award for Outstanding Lead Actress in a Drama Series twice (from five nominations), and Lewis won the Primetime Emmy Award for Outstanding Lead Actor in a Drama Series once (from two nominations). Supporting cast members Mandy Patinkin, Morena Baccarin, Rupert Friend, and F. Murray Abraham also received Emmy acting nominations.

== Overview ==
Season	Episodes	Originally released	
Season	Episodes	First released	Last released
1	12	October 2, 2011	December 18, 2011
2	12	September 30, 2012	December 16, 2012
3	12	September 29, 2013	December 15, 2013
4	12	October 5, 2014	December 21, 2014
5	12	October 4, 2015	December 20, 2015
6	12	January 15, 2017	April 9, 2017
7	12	February 11, 2018	April 29, 2018
8	12	February 9, 2020	April 26, 2020

=== Season 1 (2011) ===
Carrie Mathison, a CIA operations officer, conducts an unauthorized operation in Iraq and is reassigned to the CIA's Counterterrorism Center in Langley, Virginia. Nicholas Brody, a U.S. Marine sergeant who had been reported as missing in action since 2003, is rescued from a compound belonging to terrorist Abu Nazir. Brody is heralded as a war hero, but Carrie comes to suspect that he is planning a terrorist attack against the United States.

=== Season 2 (2012) ===
After being expelled from the CIA in disgrace, Carrie is brought back into the field for an intelligence gathering mission in Beirut. Brody strengthens his position as a potential running mate for Vice President Walden.

=== Season 3 (2013) ===
In the aftermath of a terrorist attack on Langley, Brody has fled the country while Carrie strives to clear his name. An initiative by Saul, now CIA director, targets Iranian intelligence officer Majid Javadi, who financed the Langley bombing.

=== Season 4 (2014) ===
Carrie is working as CIA station chief in Kabul, Afghanistan, and later in Islamabad, Pakistan. She oversees a botched drone strike on the suspected location of terrorist mastermind Haissam Haqqani, which causes strife within the CIA and provokes the dangerous Haqqani. Carrie recruits a young asset in an attempt to track down Haqqani. Information provided to the Pakistanis by a disgruntled American leads to disastrous results.

=== Season 5 (2015) ===
Two years after the events of season 4, Carrie is no longer an intelligence officer and is now working as head of security for a private charitable foundation and its billionaire owner in Berlin, Germany, but becomes targeted as part of a Russian infiltration of the CIA's Berlin Station. Meanwhile, Quinn investigates a jihadist terrorist cell.

=== Season 6 (2017) ===
Several months after the previous season, Carrie is back in the United States, living in Brooklyn, New York. She now works at a foundation that provides aid to Muslims living in the United States. The season features the election of the first female president and occurs between election day and inauguration day.

=== Season 7 (2018) ===
Carrie has left her job in the White House and moved back to D.C. to live with her sister Maggie. She takes on the Keane administration to secure the release of 200 members of the intelligence community who were arrested under President Keane's orders the previous season.

=== Season 8 (2020) ===
Saul, now National Security Advisor, is sent to Afghanistan to engage the Taliban in peace negotiations. He needs help from Carrie, who is recovering from her confinement in a Russian prison.

== Cast and characters ==
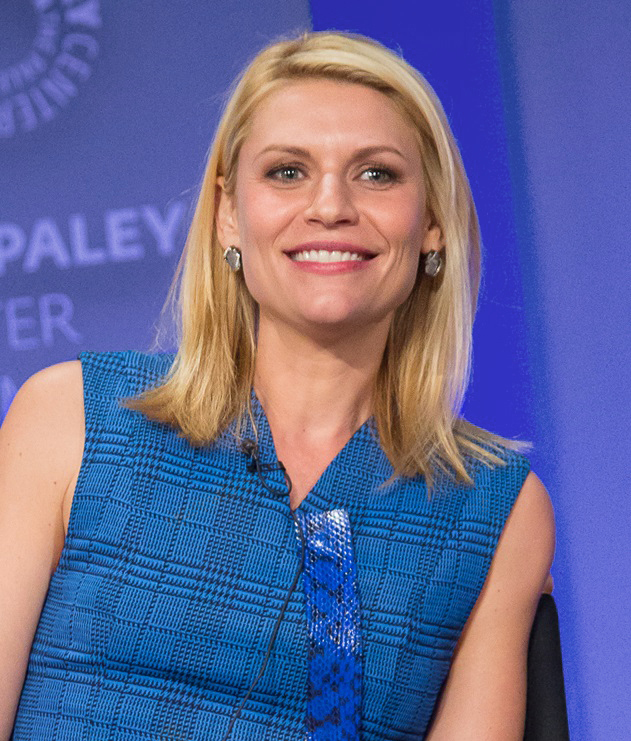
Claire Danes portrays series lead character Carrie Mathison

- Claire Danes as Carrie Mathison, a CIA case officer assigned to the Counterterrorism Center. She has bipolar disorder and believes Brody to be a terrorist when he returns to the United States. After leaving the CIA, Carrie becomes a private citizen, living in Berlin and later, New York.
- Damian Lewis as Nicholas Brody, a Congressman and retired U.S. Marine gunnery sergeant (formerly sergeant) who is rescued by Delta Force after being held by al-Qaeda as a prisoner of war for eight years (starring seasons 1–3, guest season 4).
- Morena Baccarin as Jessica Brody, Brody's wife. Assuming her husband is dead, she has a relationship with Mike. She struggles to adjust when Brody returns after such a long absence (seasons 1–3).
- David Harewood as David Estes, the director of the CIA's Counter-terrorism Center and Carrie's boss. The two have a tumultuous relationship due to her aggressive way of working and the suggestion of a past sexual relationship between them (seasons 1–2).
- Diego Klattenhoff as Mike Faber, a U.S. Marine major (formerly captain in season 1). Brody's best friend who, assuming Brody is dead, begins a relationship with Jessica (starring seasons 1–2, guest season 3).
- Jackson Pace as Chris Brody, Brody's son (seasons 1–3).
- Morgan Saylor as Dana Brody, Brody's daughter (seasons 1–3).
- Mandy Patinkin as Saul Berenson, Carrie's mentor and the CIA's Middle East division chief; during season 3 he is acting director of the CIA.
- Jamey Sheridan as William Walden, Vice President of the United States and a former director of the CIA (recurring season 1, starring season 2).
- David Marciano as Virgil Piotrowski, a freelance surveillance expert and former CIA employee whom Carrie enlists for the surveillance of Brody (recurring seasons 1 and 3, starring season 2).
- Navid Negahban as Abu Nazir, a high-ranking member of al-Qaeda (recurring season 1, starring season 2, guest season 3).
- Rupert Friend as Peter Quinn, a CIA operative and assassin (recurring season 2, starring seasons 3–6).
- Sarita Choudhury as Mira Berenson, Saul's wife (recurring seasons 1 and 4, guest seasons 2 and 6, starring season 3).
- Tracy Letts as Senator Andrew Lockhart, who later assumes the role of director of the CIA (seasons 3–4).
- F. Murray Abraham as Dar Adal, a longtime black-ops specialist for the CIA (recurring seasons 2 and 4, starring seasons 3 and 5–6, guest season 7).
- Nazanin Boniadi as Fara Sherazi, a Muslim CIA analyst (recurring season 3, starring season 4).
- Laila Robins as Martha Boyd, the United States ambassador to Pakistan (season 4).
- Sebastian Koch as Otto Düring, a German philanthropist and Carrie's new boss (starring season 5, guest season 6).
- Miranda Otto as Allison Carr, the current Berlin chief of station, working directly for Saul Berenson (season 5).
- Alexander Fehling as Jonas Hollander, legal counsel for the Düring Foundation and Carrie's new boyfriend (season 5).
- Sarah Sokolovic as Laura Sutton, an American journalist in Berlin, who works for the Düring Foundation (season 5).
- Elizabeth Marvel as Elizabeth Keane, the President-elect and later President of the United States (seasons 6–7).
- Maury Sterling as Max Piotrowski, Virgil's brother and a freelance surveillance expert who often works with Carrie (recurring seasons 1–4 and 6, starring seasons 7–8).
- Linus Roache as David Wellington, White House Chief of Staff to President Keane (guest season 6, starring seasons 7–8).
- Jake Weber as Brett O'Keefe, a firebrand right-wing radio host (recurring season 6, starring season 7).
- Morgan Spector as Dante Allen, an FBI agent and old friend of Carrie's who is looking into the hundreds of people President Keane has detained (season 7).
- Costa Ronin as Lieutenant Colonel Yevgeny Gromov, a Russian GRU senior operations officer (recurring season 7, starring season 8).
- Nimrat Kaur as Tasneem Qureishi, a member of Pakistan's Inter-Services Intelligence (recurring season 4, starring season 8).
- Numan Acar as Haissam Haqqani, a Taliban leader and high-priority CIA target (recurring season 4, starring season 8).

== Production ==
=== Development history ===
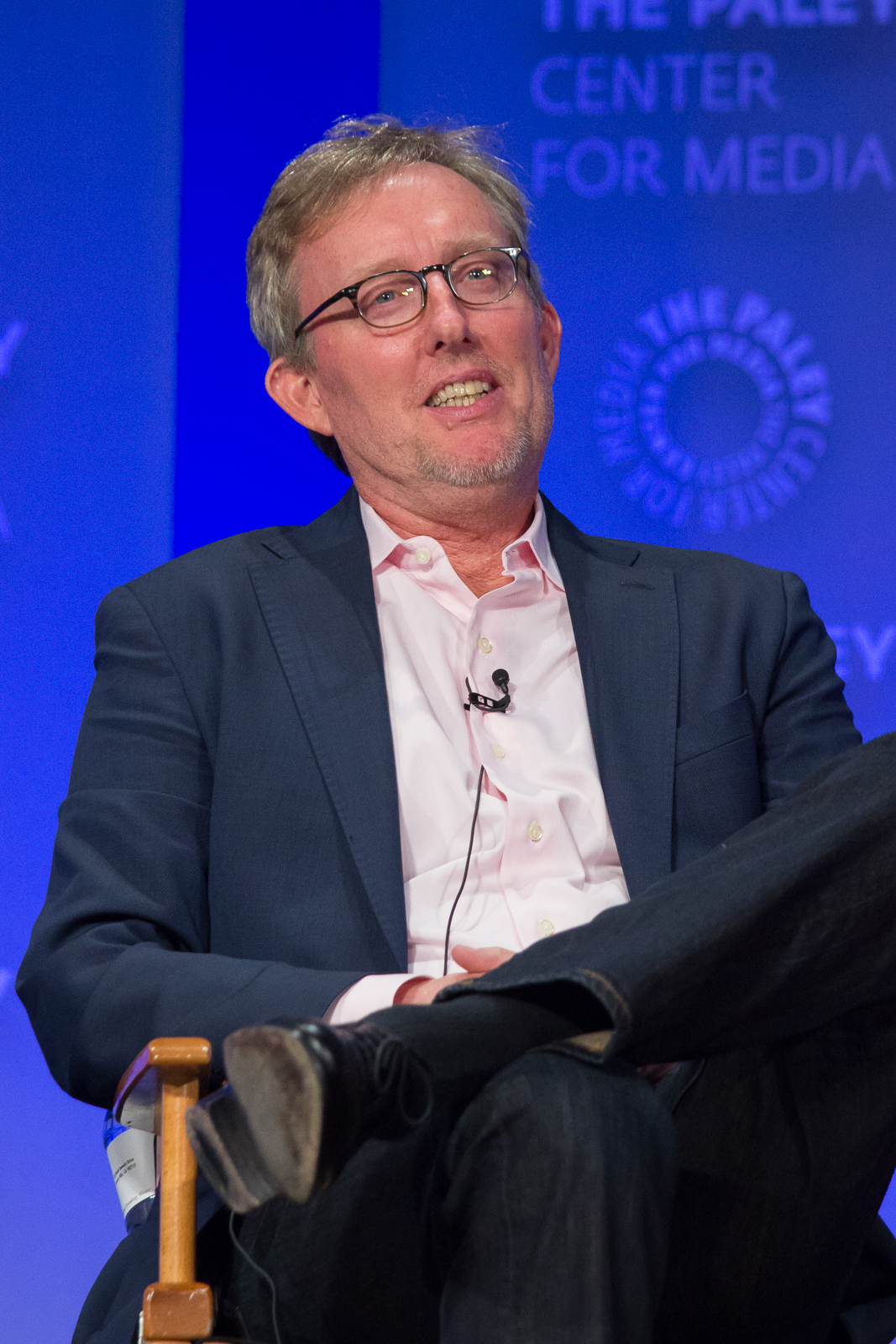
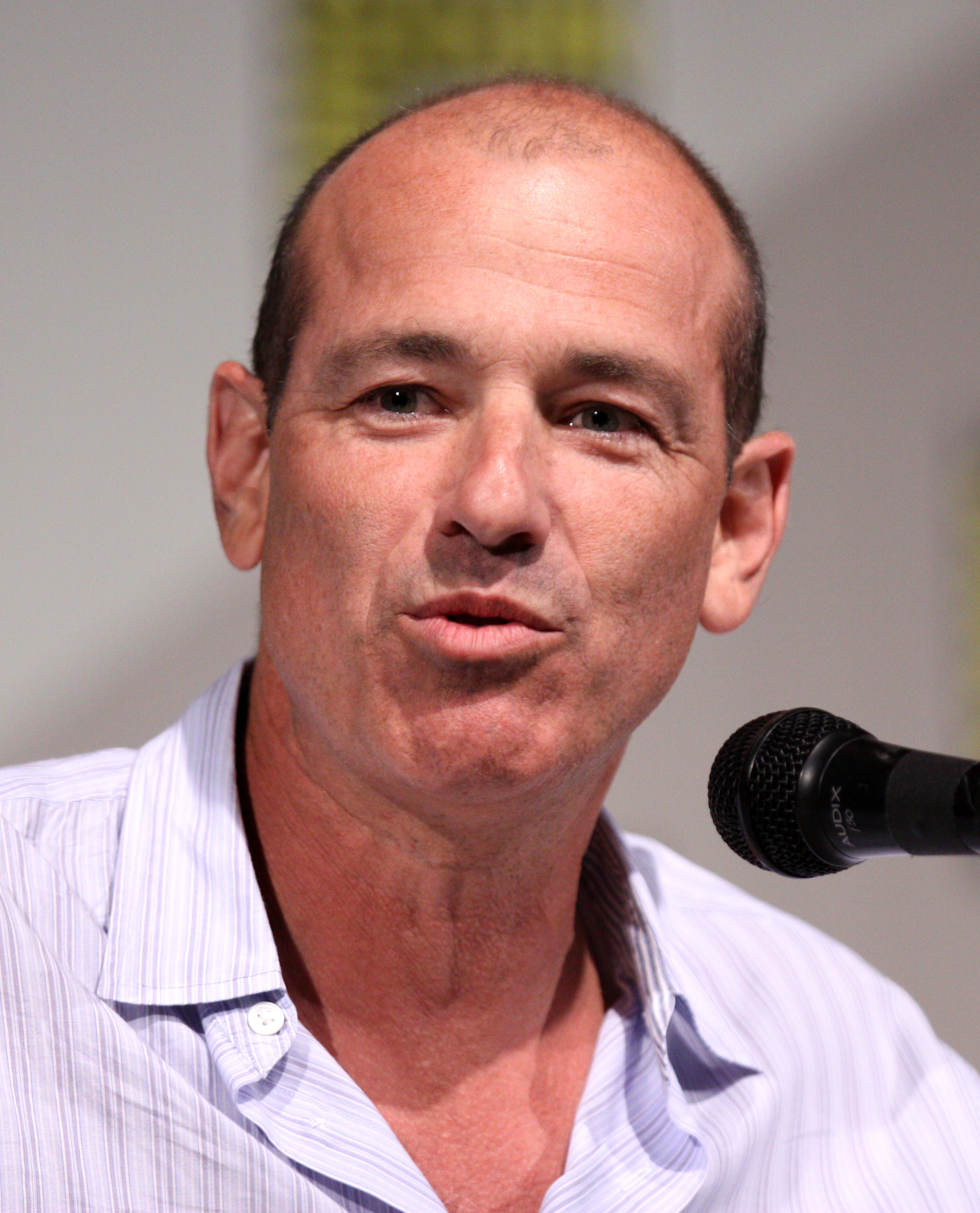
The series was developed for American television by Alex Gansa (left) and Howard Gordon (right). The two had previously worked together on 24 and The X-Files.

Based on Gideon Raff's Israeli series Prisoners of War, Homeland was developed by Howard Gordon and Alex Gansa in early 2010. The two had previously worked together on the similarly themed series 24. On September 19, 2010, Showtime placed a pilot order for Homeland as the first project David Nevins had undertaken since leaving Imagine Entertainment to become president of Showtime. Gordon, Gansa and Raff wrote the pilot, Michael Cuesta directed the pilot, with Gordon, Gansa, Raff, Avi Nir, and Ran Telem serving as executive producers.

The series was passed on by FX before landing at Showtime who green-lit a 12-episode order on April 7, 2011. It was announced that Chip Johannessen would join the series as a co-executive producer, while Michael Cuesta, who had served as the director on the pilot, would join the series as an executive producer. Ben Affleck was originally slated to direct the pilot.

On July 21, 2011, at San Diego Comic-Con, Showtime announced that the series would premiere on October 2, 2011. Along with the announcement of the premiere date for the series, the network also announced that the names of the characters portrayed by Claire Danes and Damian Lewis had been renamed Carrie Mathison and Nicholas Brody, from Carrie Anderson and Scott Brody, respectively. The series is produced by Fox 21.

In September, 2016, Gansa announced that he would be crafting the eighth season as the series' last. He pointed out that the decision would ultimately fall on Showtime, but that he would be moving toward an eight-season close. He also stated that it would be his desire to film the final season in Israel, where Homeland's source series, Prisoners of War, originated.

=== Casting ===
Casting announcements began in November, 2010, with Claire Danes first to be cast. Danes portrays Carrie Mathison, "a driven CIA officer battling her own psychological demons." Other actresses considered for the Mathison role included Robin Wright, Maria Bello and Halle Berry. Next to join the series was Mandy Patinkin as Saul Berenson, "the smart and politically savvy CIA Division Chief... who is Carrie's main champion in the intelligence upper echelon and her sounding board." Laura Fraser was initially cast as Jessica Brody, "Nick Brody's smart, strong wife.", but after the pilot Fraser was replaced by Morena Baccarin. Next to join the series were Damian Lewis and David Harewood, with Lewis playing Brody, "who returns home after spending eight years as a prisoner of war in Baghdad", while Harewood was cast as David Estes, "a rising star in the CIA, Carrie's boss ... is the youngest director of the Counterterrorism Center in the Agency's history." Gansa pushed for Lewis in the Brody role despite hesitations from series producers in favor of Ryan Phillippe, Kyle Chandler and Alessandro Nivola. Diego Klattenhoff, Morgan Saylor, and Jackson Pace were the last actors to join the main cast, with Klattenhoff playing Mike Faber, "Brody's close friend and fellow Marine, Mike Faber was convinced that Brody was dead, which is how he justified falling in love with Brody's wife Jessica", Saylor playing Dana Brody, "The Brodys' oldest child", and Pace playing Chris Brody, "Nick and Jessica's eager-to-please, self-conscious thirteen year-old son."

It was later announced that Jamey Sheridan, Navid Negahban, Amir Arison, and Brianna Brown had joined the series as recurring guest stars. Sheridan was cast as the Vice President of the United States, Negahban was cast as Abu Nazir, with Arison playing Prince Farid Bin Abbud and Brown playing Lynne Reed.

=== Writing ===
Beginning in season four, the showrunners began taking over the top floor of City Tavern Club in Washington, D.C., for "Spy Camp". According to Gansa, the day would start at 8 a.m. and end after 10 p.m. where the writers, producers and some actors would meet with former CIA, ambassadors, ex-military, journalists and intelligence officers to discuss national security issues to inform the storylines. "Spy Camp" experts included A. Elizabeth Jones, Stanley A. McChrystal, Dana Priest and Michael Hayden.

Washington Post writer Barton Gellman connected the Homeland team on an hours-long video call with Edward Snowden before he appeared in documentaries or did interviews. According to Patinkin, they could not "budge him from his soapbox" to discuss personal information while Snowden was in Moscow.

=== Filming ===
The series is filmed in and around Charlotte, North Carolina. The location was chosen because of film tax credits, and the atmosphere matches nearby the Washington metropolitan area, where the series is set. Production claims it is easier to get around the area's smaller city atmosphere rather than in large cities where filming typically occurs. Another frequent setting is nearby Mooresville. Executive producer Michael Cuesta said Mooresville is "played for quite a few rural-type one-stoplight main-street type of towns."

The Brody family house is in Mountainbrook, a Charlotte neighborhood near SouthPark Mall. Queens University of Charlotte is the Brody daughter's college. CIA headquarters is Cambridge Corporate Center in University Research Park. Charlotte/Douglas International Airport, the Ritz-Carlton, the old courthouse, Ed's Tavern, and Zack's Hamburgers in Charlotte, as well as Rural Hill in Huntersville and Lake Norman, have also served as filming locations.

Production for season two began in May, 2012 with the series filming in Israel for two weeks, with Israeli cities standing in for Beirut. The rest of the season was filmed in Charlotte and Concord, North Carolina.

Production for the third season began in late May, 2013, continuing production in Raleigh, North Carolina. The series also filmed in Old San Juan, Puerto Rico, which stood in for Caracas, Venezuela. The series was also planning on returning to Israel for additional filming, but filming moved to Morocco, due to ongoing conflicts in Syria.

Production for the fourth season took place from June through November, 2014 in Cape Town, South Africa, while the fifth season moved production to Berlin, Germany.

The sixth season began production in August, 2016 and filmed in New York City and Morocco. The seventh season began production on September 11, 2017, and primarily filmed in Richmond, Virginia. Additional filming for season seven occurred in Budapest, Hungary, for episodes 11 and 12. The eighth season began filming in February 2019 in Morocco.

=== Other media ===
Since the conclusion of season 2, some pieces of in-universe material have been published.

- HomelandAftermath.com provides a deeper look into the aftermath of season 2, with news reports and survivors' accounts.
- Twentieth Century Fox partnered with Audible.com to offer Phantom Pain – A Homeland Story (2014), a 30-minute audio piece narrated by Damian Lewis, which details Brody's movements between seasons 2 and 3 of the show.
- Homeland: Carrie's Run (2013) is a novel that tells the story of Carrie Mathison in a series of events that take place before season 1.
- Another prequel novel set in 2009, Homeland: Saul's Game (2014), was released on October 7, 2014.

== Reception ==
=== Critical response ===
Critical response of Homeland
Season	Rotten Tomatoes	Metacritic
1	100%	92
2	93%	96
3	80%	77
4	81%	74
5	88%	76
6	78%	68
7	81%	65
8	85%	71

The first season received near universal acclaim. Metacritic gave it a rating of 92 out of 100 based on 29 critics. TV Guide named it the best TV show of 2011 and highly applauded the performances given by Damian Lewis and Claire Danes. Metacritic named Homeland the second-best TV show of 2011, based on aggregating the year-end top-ten lists of a number of major TV critics. The second season also received near universal acclaim, achieving a Metacritic rating of 96 out of 100 from 21 critics. The third season initially received generally favorable reviews, with a rating of 77 out of 100 based on 23 critics, but reviews became more negative as the season progressed.

Hank Stuever of The Washington Post gave the pilot episode an A−, saying "What makes Homeland rise above other post-9/11 dramas is Danes's stellar performance as Carrie—easily this season's strongest female character," and that "The latter half of the first episode is exhilarating. I'm hooked." Matthew Gilbert of The Boston Globe gave it a solid A grade, and said it was his favorite drama pilot of the season. Entertainment Weekly's Ken Tucker gave it an A−, stating "It's the fall season's most intriguing, tense puzzler." IGN TV gave it a positive review, saying that it was an "ace thriller" that also managed to have something to say about the "war on terror". The seventh episode, "The Weekend", received overwhelming critical acclaim and was described by both the creators of the show and Lewis as a "watershed" episode.

Greg Dixon of The New Zealand Herald criticized Homeland's thin plotting, Danes's "insane levels of overacting", and Lewis's "passivity". Robert Rorke of the New York Post wrote about the third season that "[s]eldom in the history of cable TV has a series imploded as quickly as Showtime's Homeland. [...] The show, in the middle of its third season, is now impossible to take seriously." In 2014, Laura Durkay of The Washington Post criticized Homeland for its portrayal of Islamophobic stereotypes and called it "the most bigoted show on television".

James Donaghy of The Guardian wrote: "It took a while for Homeland to realise its true calling as a showcase for TV's greatest surrogate father-daughter relationship", adding that "a perfect conclusion rewards the viewers who persevered with it" to the end of the eighth season.

Former U.S. President Barack Obama has praised Homeland and is known to be a fan of the show. Former Secretary of State Hillary Clinton's office asked for early screeners of episodes from the first season.

In December 2023, Variety ranked Homeland #98 on its list of the 100 greatest TV shows of all time.

=== Ratings ===
The original broadcast of the pilot episode on October 2, 2011, received 1.08 million viewers, becoming Showtime's highest-rated drama premiere in eight years. The episode received a total of 2.78 million viewers with additional broadcasts and on demand views. The final episode of season one received 1.7 million viewers, making it the most-watched season finale of any first-year Showtime series. Ratings increased in Season 2, peaking with 2.36 million viewers for the December 9, 2012 first-run broadcast.

The series has also performed well in the UK, where it airs on Channel 4. The pilot episode drew 2.2 million viewers and the season one finale drew 2.8 million viewers. Season 2 saw a drop in viewership, with the season two premiere drawing in 2.3 million viewers, but the finale only 2.1 million.

Viewership and ratings per season of Homeland
Season	Timeslot (ET)	Episodes	First aired		Last aired		Avg. viewers (millions)
Season	Timeslot (ET)	Episodes	Date	Viewers (millions)	Date	Viewers (millions)	Avg. viewers (millions)
1	Sunday 10:00 pm	12	October 2, 2011	1.08	December 18, 2011	1.71	1.25
2	Sunday 10:00 pm	12	September 30, 2012	1.73	December 16, 2012	2.29	1.92
3	Sunday 9:00 pm	12	September 29, 2013	1.88	December 15, 2013	2.38	1.95
4	Sunday 9:00 pm	12	October 5, 2014	1.61	December 21, 2014	1.92	1.65
5	Sunday 9:00 pm	12	October 4, 2015	1.66	December 20, 2015	2.07	1.53
6	Sunday 9:00 pm	12	January 15, 2017	1.08	April 9, 2017	1.90	1.28
7	Sunday 9:00 pm	12	February 11, 2018	1.22	April 29, 2018	1.30	1.23
8	Sunday 9:00 pm	12	February 9, 2020	0.60	April 26, 2020	1.26	0.83

=== Awards and nominations ===
In its debut season, the series received several industry awards and nominations. The series was recognized with a Peabody Award in April, 2012 describing the series as "a game of cat and mouse, a psychological thriller and a Rorschach test of post-9/11 doubts, fears and suspicions rolled into one." At the 64th Primetime Emmy Awards, the series received nine nominations winning six awards, including Outstanding Drama Series, Claire Danes for Outstanding Lead Actress in a Drama Series, Damian Lewis for Outstanding Lead Actor in a Drama Series, and Alex Gansa, Howard Gordon and Gideon Raff for Outstanding Writing for a Drama Series for the pilot episode. The series also won awards for Outstanding Casting for a Drama Series and Outstanding Single-Camera Picture Editing for a Drama Series.

At the 69th Golden Globe Awards, the series won the award for Best Television Series – Drama, and Claire Danes won for Best Actress – Television Series Drama, with Damian Lewis receiving a nomination for Best Actor – Television Series Drama. At the 70th Golden Globe Awards, the series won its second consecutive award for Best Television Series – Drama, Danes won again for Best Actress – Television Series Drama, and Lewis won for Best Actor – Television Series Drama, after being nominated the previous year.

=== Controversies ===
In October, 2012, the Lebanese government was reportedly planning to sue the show's producers, asserting misrepresentation of Hamra Street in Beirut, Lebanon. Specifically, in the second episode of the second season "Beirut Is Back", the street was shown as a narrow alleyway with militia roaming and associated with terrorist activity. The Lebanese government said the street is actually a bustling modern hub of cafes and bars. The Minister of Tourism Fadi Abboud said he would take legal action, stating that "Beirut is one of the most secure capitals in the world, more secure than London or New York." Abboud also protested the filming of episodes in Israel rather than Lebanon.

Peter Beaumont of The Guardian wrote of the series: "High-profile Muslims living in the US share a secret: both willingly or otherwise they are covert helpers of Abu Nazir, the al-Qaida terrorist leader. In other words, it does not matter whether they are rich, smart, discreetly enjoying a western lifestyle or attractive: all are to be suspected." Raff's works have received criticism for their portrayal of Muslims. In an article for Salon, Laila Al-Arian called the show the most Islamophobic show on television, accused it of portraying Muslims under the light of simplistic concepts and as a monolithic, single-minded group whose only purpose is to hurt Americans, and basing the Brody character to such an extent on "pseudo-psychology that only an audience conditioned by the Islamophobic, anti-Arab tropes in our media could find him consistent." She further criticizes the show for fanning hysteria of Muslim "infiltration" of the United States; poor mastery of even basic Arabic; misrepresentation of Islamic and Arab culture; and simplifying the politics of militant Islamic organizations, for instance by conflating groups that in real life are rivals.

An article in The Atlantic by Yair Rosenberg challenged al-Arian's criticisms, arguing that they missed what made the show valuable, which was that it was no gung-ho salute to U.S. militarism and tactics on the war on terror nor a black-and-white portrayal of good Americans versus evil Muslims, but rather a show that challenges the prejudices of its viewers rather than affirming them. Similarly, Zach Novetsky of Tablet asserted that al-Arian's criticisms were a function of the show's having enough "depth and layers for someone to concoct a totally inaccurate interpretation of what the show really is about."

Middle East commentator Rachel Shabi wrote that the show's take on U.S. foreign policy in the Middle East does little more than defend the talking points of its advocates, presenting even U.S. violence against civilians as "necessary acts in pursuit of far worse crimes".

Middle East policy expert Fawaz Gerges told TheWrap, "Homeland is poisonous to any attempt to bridge the divide between the two nations [United States and Iran]".

The German news magazine Der Spiegel claimed the show depicted "hysterical CIA agents in a hysterical country" and demonstrates the "paranoid tactics that delegitimize its democracy" that the United States has applied and exceeded in real life, referring to the tapping of German Chancellor Angela Merkel's phone.

In a 2014 report, human rights group Amnesty International claimed that shows like Homeland "have glorified torture to a generation", citing a survey they conducted in the UK in which 29% of respondents agreed that "torture is sometimes necessary and acceptable to protect the public".

In October 2015, three graffiti artists hired to add graffiti writings on the set of "The Tradition of Hospitality", an episode in season 5, (intended to portray a refugee camp on the Lebanon–Syria border) to add "authenticity" to the scenes, wrote instead slogans accusing the show of racism.

== Home video releases ==
Season	Episodes	DVD and Blu-ray release dates		
Season	Episodes	Region 1	Region 2	Region 4
1	12	August 28, 2012	September 10, 2012	September 19, 2012
2	12	September 10, 2013	September 23, 2013	September 12, 2013
3	12	September 9, 2014	September 8, 2014	September 24, 2014
4	12	September 8, 2015	June 15, 2015	April 29, 2015
5	12	January 10, 2017	April 25, 2016	April 27, 2016
6	12	February 6, 2018	July 3, 2017	July 19, 2017
7	12	August 13, 2019 (DVD only)	September 24, 2018	November 5, 2018 (DVD only)
8	12	N/A	December 22, 2021 (NTSC-J DVD in Japan only)	N/A

== Broadcast ==
Internationally, the series premiered on November 1, 2011, on Super Channel in Canada, on January 13, 2012, on RTÉ in Ireland, on January 22, 2012, on Network Ten in Australia, on February 19, 2012, on Channel 4 in the United Kingdom, and on September 30, 2013, on Star World in Bangladesh, India and Pakistan.

In New Zealand, the series is distributed by the Sky Television Network's streaming service Neon following its merger with Spark New Zealand's former streaming service Lightbox on July 7, 2020.
