= Karin Lewicki =

American writer (born 1977)

- Born: 1977 (age 48–49)
- Occupations: Television and fiction writer
- Years active: 1998–present

Karin Lewicki is an internationally noted American writer. She started in television as Winnie Holzman's assistant on Once and Again, and has a screenplay on The Black List, Haley Means Unplugged.

Her credits include Dawson's Creek and Cold Case, and she was one of the early contributors to the literary magazine Juked. She attended Harvard University, and lives in Los Angeles, California. Her academic work focuses on psychiatry and motherhood.
