= Wrong Planet =

Online community for neurodivergent people

- Website type: Virtual community
- Available in: English
- Owner: Alex Plank
- Creators: Alex Plank and Dan Grover
- Website: wrongplanet.net
- Registration: Optional
- Launched: 2004; 22 years ago
- Current status: Active

Wrong Planet (sometimes referred to by its URL, wrongplanet.net) is an online community for "individuals (and parents / professionals of those) with autism, Asperger syndrome, ADHD, PDDs, and other neurological differences". The site was started in 2004 by Dan Grover and Alex Plank It includes a chatroom, a forum, and articles describing how to deal with daily issues. Wrong Planet has been referenced by the mainstream U.S. media.

== History ==
In 2006, Alex Plank was sued by the victims of a 19-year-old member of the site, William Freund, who shot two people (and himself) in Aliso Viejo, California, after openly telling others on the site that he planned to do so.

In 2007, a man who was accused of murdering his dermatologist posted on the site while eluding the police. Wrong Planet was covered in a Dateline NBC report on the incident.

In 2008, Wrong Planet began getting involved in autism self-advocacy, with the goal intended to further the rights of autistic individuals living in the United States. Alex Plank, representing the site, testified at the Health and Human Services' Interagency Autism Coordinating Committee.

In 2010, Wrong Planet created a television show about autism called Autism Talk TV. Sponsors of this web series include Autism Speaks. The show is hosted by Alex Plank and Jack Robison, the son of author John Elder Robison. Neurodiversity advocates have accused Plank of betraying Wrong Planet's goal for autism acceptance by accepting money from Autism Speaks for this web series.
