= Meredith Stiehm =

American TV producer and writer (born 1969)

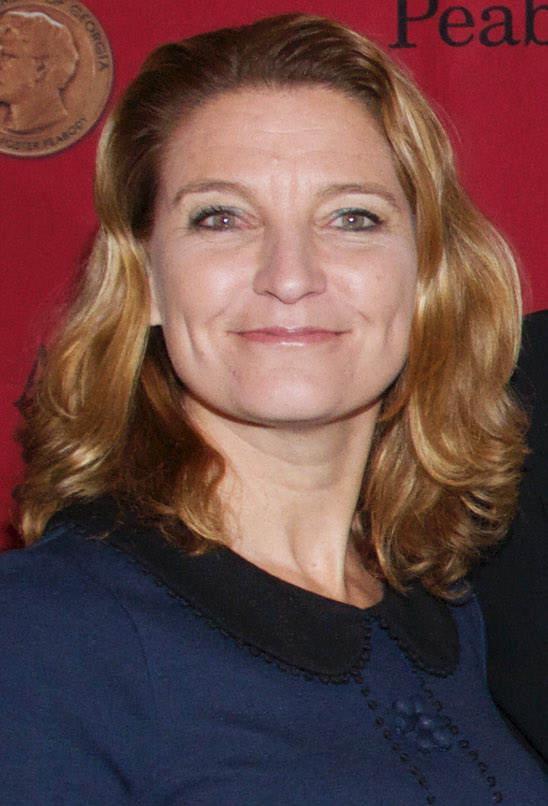

President of the Writers Guild of America West
- Incumbent
- Assumed office 2021
- Preceded by: David A. Goodman

Personal details
- Born: 1968 (age 57–58) Santa Monica, California, U.S.
- Education: University of Pennsylvania (BA)

Meredith Stiehm (/stiːm/ STEEM; born 1968) is an American television producer, writer, and trade union leader who has served as president of the Writers Guild of America West since 2021. She is the creator of the hit crime drama Cold Case and the FX thriller drama The Bridge.

== Early life and education ==
Stiehm grew up in Santa Monica, California and graduated from Santa Monica High School. She went on to attend the University of Pennsylvania (UPenn), graduating in 1990 with a degree in English and playwriting. Her experiences in urban Philadelphia at UPenn and as a young woman in the entertainment industry provided much of the inspiration for Cold Case.

== Career ==
Stiehm got her start in the entertainment industry writing for Northern Exposure and later Beverly Hills, 90210. She went on to write for NYPD Blue for four seasons, for which she earned an Emmy nomination for "Outstanding Writing for a Drama Series". On NYPD Blue Stiehm was one of very few women in the writer's room. After leaving NYPD Blue, Stiehm wrote for ER for two seasons.

In 2003, Stiehm developed the series Cold Case, a CBS crime drama following a female homicide detective specializing in "cold cases", or unsolved murders, ranging from the early 2000s all the way back to the 1910s. The show explored many issues related to 20th century American history, including sexism, racism, homophobia, anti-war activism and police brutality. In 2004, Stiehm was one of five female showrunners at CBS and, at 35, was the youngest among them. Stiehm remarked that she was mistaken for the stand-in for the lead actress on the first day of shooting. In 2005, Stiehm said that the show had more women in senior positions than any other television show. In 2010, Cold Case was cancelled after seven seasons.

In 2011, Stiehm joined the Showtime thriller Homeland as a writer and executive producer, writing several episodes in the first two seasons. Stiehm was the show's sole female writer. She won an Emmy Award for Best Series for Homeland.

Stiehm left Homeland after two seasons to develop – together with Elwood Reid – the FX series The Bridge, based on the Danish/Swedish series The Bridge. Set on the border between El Paso and Juárez, the show followed two detectives – one from the U.S., Detective Sonya Cross (Diane Kruger), and one from Mexico, Marco Ruiz (Demián Bichir) – who worked together to hunt down a serial killer operating on both sides of the U.S.-Mexican border. Due to creative differences with her co-producer, Stiehm left the series after one season and returned to Homeland. The Bridge was cancelled after its second season. Stiehm remained with Homeland for Season 3, 4 and 5.

In September 2018, it was announced that Stiehm was adapting the bestselling novel The Banker's Wife for television; the series was ultimately scrapped due to the COVID-19 pandemic.

In 2019, as WGA Agency Campaign Co-chair, Stiehm joined other WGA members in firing her agents as part of the Guild's stand against the ATA and the practice of packaging.

== Filmography ==
=== Television ===
Writing

- Northern Exposure (1994)
- Beverly Hills, 90210 (1994–1996)
- NYPD Blue (1996–2000)
- The District (2000)
- ER (2001–2002)
- Cold Case (2003–2010)
- Memphis Beat (2010)
- Homeland (2011–2015)
- The Bridge (2013)

Producer

- NYPD Blue (1998–2000)
- The District (2000)
- ER (2001–2002)
- Cold Case (2003–2010)
- Homeland (2011–2015)
- The Bridge (2013–2014)

== Awards and nominations ==
- Emmy Award (Nominated), Outstanding Writing for a Drama Series, for NYPD Blue, 1998
- Emmy Award (Nominated), Outstanding Drama Series, for NYPD Blue, 1999
- Emmy Award (Nominated), Outstanding Drama Series, for ER, 2001
- Emmy Award (Winner), Outstanding Drama Series, for Homeland, 2012
- Emmy Award (Nominated), Outstanding Drama Series, for Homeland, 2013
- Emmy Award (Nominated), Outstanding Drama Series, for Homeland, 2015
- Emmy Award (Nominated), Outstanding Drama Series, for Homeland, 2016
