= Elwood Reid =

American novelist

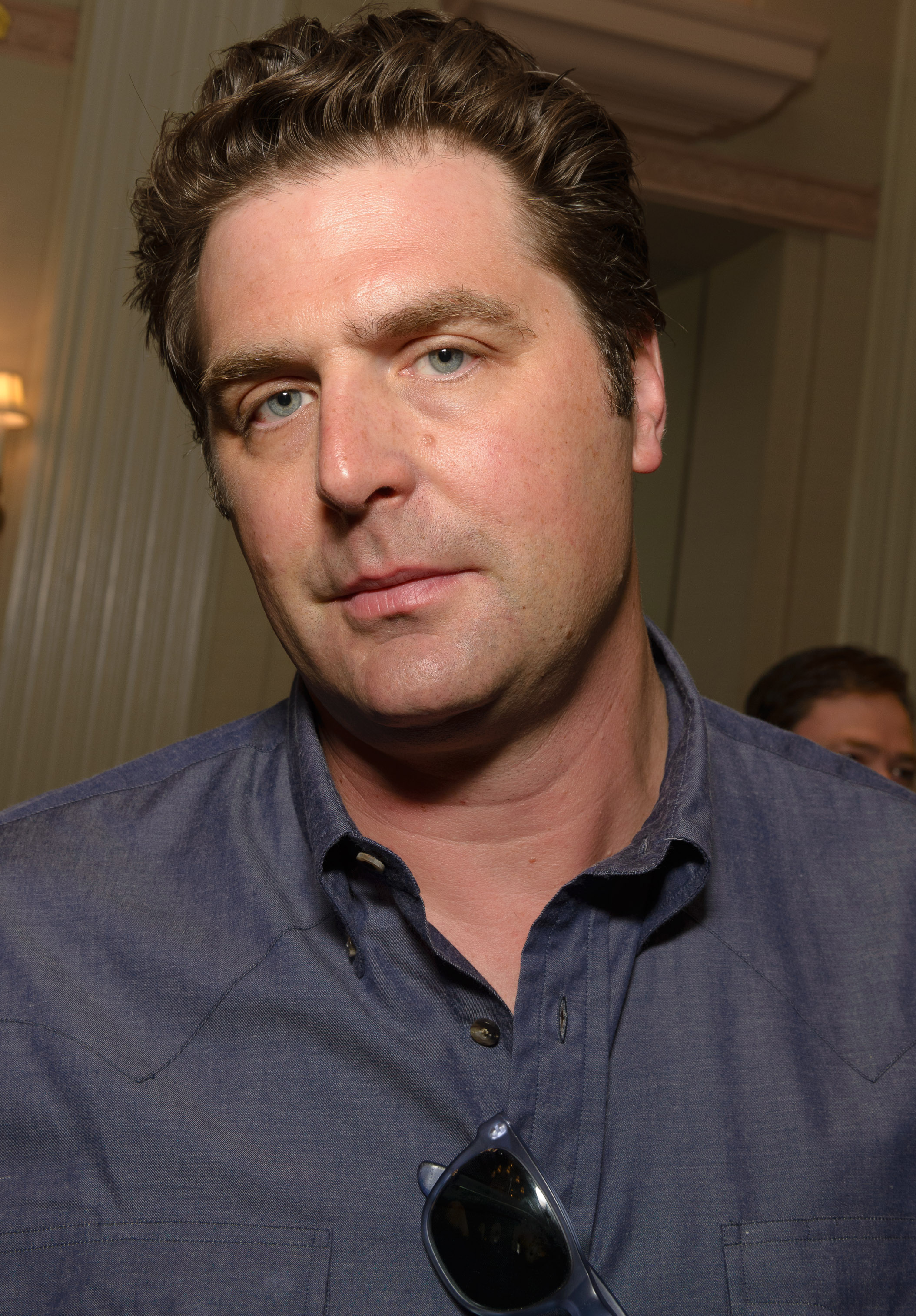
- Born: December 19, 1966 (age 59); Cleveland, Ohio, U.S.
- Education: University of Michigan

Brian "Elwood" Reid (born December 19, 1966) is an American novelist, short-story writer and television screenwriter.

== Early life ==
Reid was born in Cleveland, Ohio in a working-class area. Reid played college football for the Michigan Wolverines from 1985 to 1986 on a football scholarship.

A great influence on him was American novelist Elmore Leonard. When he died in August 2013, Reid, who considered Leonard to be a major influence, extended condolences to Leonard on Twitter and praised him as being "one of the greats".

== Prose ==
=== Novels ===
- D.B. (Doubleday, 2004; Anchor Books, paperback, 2005)
- Midnight Sun (Doubleday, 2000; Anchor Books, paperback, 2002)
- If I Don't Six (Doubleday, 1998)

=== Short story collections ===
- What Salmon Know (Doubleday, 1999)

== Television ==
- Close to Home (2006–2007)
- Cold Case (2008–2010)
- Undercovers (2010–2011)
- Hawaii 5-0 (2011–2012)
- The Bridge (2013–2014)
- The Chi (2018–present)
- Barkskins (2020–present)
- Big Sky (2021)
- The Old Man (2024)
- Tracker (2024–present)
