= Cold Case =

American television series

- Promotional poster
- Genre: Crime drama; Police procedural; Mystery
- Created by: Meredith Stiehm
- Starring: Kathryn Morris; Justin Chambers; Thom Barry; John Finn; Jeremy Ratchford; Danny Pino; Tracie Thoms
- Theme music composer: Helmut and Franz Vonlichten with intro by Michael A. Levine
- Opening theme: Nara
- Composer: Michael A. Levine
- Country of origin: United States
- Original language: English
- No. of seasons: 7
- No. of episodes: 156 (list of episodes)

Production
- Executive producers: Meredith Stiehm; Jerry Bruckheimer; Jonathan Littman
- Production locations: Philadelphia, Pennsylvania
- Running time: 42–45 minutes
- Production companies: Jerry Bruckheimer Television; CBS Television Studios (Note: Credited as CBS Productions from seasons 1–3 and CBS Paramount Network Television from seasons 4–6.); Warner Bros. Television

Original release
- Network: CBS
- Release: September 28, 2003 – May 2, 2010

Related
- CSI: Crime Scene Investigation; CSI: Miami; CSI: NY; CSI: Cyber; CSI: Vegas; Without a Trace

Cold Case is an American police procedural crime drama television series. It ran on CBS from September 28, 2003, to May 2, 2010. The series revolved around a fictionalized Philadelphia Police Department division that specializes in investigating cold cases, usually homicides. On May 18, 2010, the series was cancelled after seven seasons.

== Premise ==
The show is set in Philadelphia, Pennsylvania, and it follows Detective Lilly Rush (Kathryn Morris), a homicide detective with the Philadelphia Police Department, who specializes in cold cases, investigations which are no longer being actively pursued by the department. Rush was initially partnered with Detective Chris Lassing (Justin Chambers) in the first five episodes and then with Detective Scotty Valens (Danny Pino) for the remainder of the series. They work under Lieutenant John Stillman (John Finn) and are assisted by other detectives from their squad—Nick Vera (Jeremy Ratchford), Will Jeffries (Thom Barry), and beginning in season three, Kat Miller (Tracie Thoms).

Usually, each episode would focus on a single investigation. All cases involved murders committed (or bodies found) in Philadelphia, although investigations occasionally required travel outside the city. Cases were also spread out over much of the previous century, with some as recent as a year or two old and others dating back to the 1910s. Generally, an investigation would begin when the police received a new lead, or new direction, on a case.

Over the course of the episode, the detectives would interview witnesses associated with the crime and piece together the story of what led the victims to their death. These interviews were accompanied by flashback sequences to the era of the murder, which dramatized the testimony. Through the flashbacks, the show examined many issues related to 20th-century history, including racism, homophobia, transphobia, sexism, abortion, and police brutality.

The show was distinguished by double casting, in which the characters and witnesses would flash back and forth in the scene representing them as they looked at the time of the crime and in the present day. At the end of the episode, when the killer or killers were exposed and confronted, the confession would be in a flashback scene depicting the murder. The police would be shown arresting the killer and walking them into custody. The victims would sometimes also reappear as fading visions to one of the police officers.

== Music ==
The theme song is an excerpt from "Nara" by E.S. Posthumus, with an introduction by series composer Michael A. Levine that begins with an otherworldly wail from vocalist Elise Morris. Besides Levine's original music, each episode makes extensive use of era-appropriate music for flashbacks to the year in question. Some episodes contain music only from one artist such as Ray Charles, U2, Bruce Springsteen, Nirvana, Pearl Jam, The Doors, John Mellencamp, Johnny Cash, Bob Seger, Pink Floyd, Tim McGraw, Bob Dylan, Santana, Frank Sinatra and John Lennon. Pearl Jam's music was used in the two-part season-six finale, the first time one artist's music has been used for two full episodes.

== Cast and characters ==
- Kathryn Morris as Lilly Rush, a Homicide Detective. Lilly first investigates a cold case during episode 1 of the series, and later continues to do so at her own request. In this capacity, Rush becomes the lead detective of the cold case division.
- Justin Chambers as Chris Lassing, a detective. Lilly's original partner (Season 1).
- Danny Pino as Scotty Valens, a detective. Lilly's second partner.
- John Finn as John Stillman, a lieutenant and the head of Philadelphia Homicide Division.
- Jeremy Ratchford as Nick Vera, a detective assigned to Homicide.
- Thom Barry as Will Jeffries, a senior detective, and Philadelphia Homicide Division's assistant-supervisor.
- Tracie Thoms as Kat Miller, a narcotics detective who later joins as a homicide detective (Seasons 3–7).

== Fictional universe ==
Danny Pino appeared as Valens in the CSI: NY episode "Cold Reveal". This episode connected Cold Case to not only CSI: NY, but also to CSI: Miami, CSI: Crime Scene Investigation, CSI: Cyber, CSI: Vegas, and Without a Trace.

== Adaptations ==
=== Japanese adaptation ===
A Japanese remake of the series, Cold Case: Shinjitsu no Tobira (コールドケース 〜真実の扉〜), set in Yokohama, was broadcast on cable network WOWOW Prime from October 22, 2016, to December 24, 2016. A second season was broadcast from October 13, 2018, to December 15, 2018, and a third season was broadcast from December 5, 2020, to February 13, 2021. The second and third seasons are filmed in 8K and downscaled to 4K for broadcast.

=== Russian adaptation ===
Cold Case was broadcast in Russia under the title Detective Rush. Company Star Media produced a Russian adaptation of the series named Without Prescription (Без срока давности). The show consisted of 25 episodes.

== Cold Squad controversy ==
At the launch of Cold Case in July 2003, a Canadian journalist asked the launch panel about similarities between Cold Case and a Canadian series called Cold Squad, which had debuted five years earlier. Cold Squad fans accused the American series of copying the Canadian program's basic premise and characters. In 2003, the Cold Squad creators considered seeking legal redress against the Cold Case producers over copyright issues. Both shows aired in Canada (and on the same network, CTV). In November 2003, the law firm O'Donnell & Schaeffer confirmed it agreed to represent the Cold Squad producers, who claimed the CBS series was a copy of their own hit show. The Globe and Mail reported that Meredith Stiehm, the American series creator, attended a TV writing seminar at the Canadian Film Centre in 2002 where the Cold Squad concept was discussed. O'Donnell lawyer, Carole Handler stated: "Our clients are very concerned about many striking similarities and have retained counsel to investigate the situation and, if necessary, to take appropriate action."

== Episodes ==
Season	Episodes	Originally released	
Season	Episodes	First released	Last released
1	23	September 28, 2003	May 23, 2004
2	23	October 3, 2004	May 22, 2005
3	23	September 25, 2005	May 21, 2006
4	24	September 24, 2006	May 6, 2007
5	18	September 23, 2007	May 4, 2008
6	23	September 28, 2008	May 10, 2009
7	22	September 27, 2009	May 2, 2010

== U.S. television ratings ==
Note: Each U.S. network television season starts in late September and ends in late May, which coincides with the completion of May sweeps.

Season		Timeslot	Season premiere	Season finale	Ranking	Rating	Viewers (in millions)
1st	2003–2004	Sunday 8:00 p.m.	September 28, 2003	May 23, 2004	#17	9.3	14.18
2nd	2004–2005	Sunday 8:00 p.m.	October 3, 2004	May 22, 2005	#14	9.7	15.10
3rd	2005–2006	Sunday 8:00 p.m.	September 25, 2005	May 21, 2006	#17	9.3	14.24
4th	2006–2007	Sunday 9:00 p.m.	September 24, 2006	May 6, 2007	#16	8.9	13.98
5th	2007–2008	Sunday 9:00 p.m.	September 23, 2007	May 4, 2008	#28	7.1	10.89
6th	2008–2009	Sunday 9:00 p.m.	September 28, 2008	May 10, 2009	#20	7.5	12.00
7th	2009–2010	Sunday 10:00 p.m. (September 27, 2009 – November 15, 2009, February 14, 2010 – May 2, 2010); Sunday 9:00 p.m. (November 22, 2009 – January 17, 2010)	September 27, 2009	May 2, 2010	#29	6.3	9.86

- In season 3 episode 9 called "A Perfect Day" Cold Case set a series rating record by attracting an audience of 19.36 million viewers.

=== Cancellation ===
Cold Case began in September 2003 and quickly became a staple of the CBS Sunday night schedule. The crime drama had a successful first season and, by season two, was averaging a 3.5 rating in the 18–49 demographic and 15.1 million viewers. For the next couple seasons, total viewership fell slightly but the demographic numbers rose, reaching a 3.8 rating in season four.

In season five, the show averaged a 2.9 rating and just under 11 million viewers and ranked 28th. In season six, the ratings sank lower, to an average of a 2.7 rating but climbed up to 12 million viewers and ranked 20th. CBS made a choice between renewing Without a Trace and Cold Case. They chose to keep Cold Case. The real ratings trouble began in the final season, when the show's ratings dropped even further to a 2.15 rating in the 18–49 demographic and 9.6 million viewers. One reason for this is that the show aired at 10:00 pm; the ratings dropped 25% to 9 million viewers. On November 22, 2009, CBS made a final attempt to increase the ratings by scheduling Cold Case at 9:00 pm. The ratings increased to 10 million viewers, but it was short-lived because on February 14, 2010, Cold Case returned to its original schedule, at 10:00 pm and the ratings dropped. The show concluded its run in May 2010 ranking at #29. More than two weeks after the series finale aired, CBS announced the show would not be renewed for an eighth season.

On May 18, 2010, CBS announced the cancellation of the series after seven seasons and 156 episodes.

Since it had become customary to end each season with a cliffhanger, season 7's final episode, "Shattered", ended leaving viewers wondering about the fates of several characters. The cancellation of the show left those questions unresolved.

=== Possible revival/reboot ===
In April 2024, a revival of the series was under discussion, but in September 2024 Deadline reported that a deal for the proposed series could not be reached between Warner Brothers Television and CBS.

== Distribution ==
=== Broadcast ===
The series aired in syndication on CBS, and also on Ion Television in the United States. and on Viva in Canada. Sleuth also aired the series occasionally. In 2011, the show aired on MyNetworkTV until its removal a year later. The show made its debut on the new over-the-air channel Start TV when it launched on September 3, 2018. It also airs on MBC Action. As of 2022, reruns are often shown on TNT.

=== Home media and streaming ===
After the program's debut in 2003, the show was not released on DVD or Blu-ray due to licensing issues related to the use of contemporary music in each episode.

In May 2020, the Roku Channel in the United States released all episodes of Cold Case to stream for the first time, in a high-definition digital format, with full subtitles and all contemporary music from the original CBS broadcasts left intact. The streaming ended in December 2020. The show returned to the service in September 2021.

Cold Case was made available for streaming on HBO Max (at the time called Max) as of June 19, 2023.

All seasons of Cold Case are also available to stream on Amazon Prime in the United Kingdom, Australia, Canada, Latin America, Italy and India.

The series also airs on Quest Red in the United Kingdom and available for streaming on Discovery+.

== Awards and nominations ==
=== Awards ===
ASCAP Award

- Top TV Series (2004)
- Top TV Series (2005)
- Top TV Series (2006)
- Top TV Series (2007)
- Top TV Series (2008)
- Top TV Series (2009)

GLAAD Media Awards

- Outstanding Individual Episode (In a Series Without a Regular Gay Character) – For episode "Best Friends" (2006).

Image Awards

- Outstanding Directing in a Dramatic Series – Paris Barclay (2006)

Imagen Foundation Awards

- Best Actor, Television – Danny Pino (2010)

=== Nominations ===
ALMA Awards

- Outstanding Actor in a Drama Television Series – Danny Pino (2008)

ASC Awards

- Outstanding Achievement in Cinematography in Regular Series (For episode "Time To Hate") (2004)

Excellence in Production Design Award

- Television – Single Camera Television Series (For episode "Factory Girls") (2005)

CDG Awards

- Outstanding Costume Design for Television Series – Period/Fantasy (2005)
- Outstanding Costume Design for Television Series – Period/Fantasy (2006)
- Outstanding Costume Design for Television Series – Period/Fantasy (2007)

GLAAD Media Awards

- Outstanding Individual Episode (In a Series Without a Regular Gay Character) (For episode "A Time to Hate") (2004)
- Outstanding Individual Episode (In a Series Without a Regular Gay Character) (For episode "It's Raining Men") (2005)
- Outstanding Individual Episode (In a Series Without a Regular Gay Character) (For episode "Daniela") (2005)
- Outstanding Individual Episode (For episode "Forever Blue") (2007)
- Outstanding Individual Episode (in a Series without a Regular LGBT Character) (For episode "Boy Crazy") (2008)

Emmy

- Outstanding Art Direction for a Single-Camera Series – Corey Kaplan, Sandy Getzler, & Timothy Stepeck (2005)

== Soundtrack ==
A soundtrack CD was released in 2008 by Lakeshore Records, featuring incidental music composed by Michael A. Levine from the first four seasons, as well as the song 300 Flowers, sung by Robbyn Kirmsse.

Track listing
No.	Title	Length
1.	"Late Returns"	3:06
2.	"The Good Death"	4:12
3.	"The Park"	1:08
4.	"Detective's Reprise"	1:40
5.	"Sister Vivian's Flashback"	1:04
6.	"Yo, Adrian (featuring Elin Carlson)"	1:13
7.	"Churchgoing People"	1:52
8.	"Gwen & Rush"	0:56
9.	"The Professor"	3:15
10.	"Sadie's Blues (featuring Carmen Twillie)"	3:47
11.	"Forever Blue"	4:59
12.	"Bad Night (featuring Robbyn Kirmsse)"	2:02
13.	"Fireflies"	1:51
14.	"Carl's Recollection"	3:42
15.	"Saving Sammy"	3:30
16.	"Freely's Flashback"	2:07
17.	"8:03 am"	2:45
18.	"Rush & George"	2:56
19.	"The Badlands (featuring Jason Ralicki)"	2:48
20.	"The Window"	1:58
21.	"Train Station"	1:04
22.	"300 Flowers (featuring Robbyn Kirmsse)"	2:48
23.	"Best Friends"	2:13
24.	"Baby Blues"	3:12

== See also ==
- Television in the United States
- The Enigma Files, UK / BBC Two, 1980
- Cold Case Files, USA / A&E, 1999 (true cases)
- Waking the Dead, UK / BBC One, 2000
- New Tricks, UK / BBC One, 2003
- NCIS, USA / CBS, 2003
- Solved, USA / ID, 2008 (true cases)
- Zettai Reido, Japan / Fuji Television, 2010
- Cold Justice, USA / TNT, 2013 (true cases)
- To Catch a Killer, CAN / OWN, 2014 (true cases)
- Signal, South Korea / tvN, 2016
- Signal, Japan / Fuji Television, 2018
- Oktopus, Czech Republic / ČT1, 2023
