= Homeland season 1 =

Season of television series

Homeland
- Season 1
- DVD cover art
- Starring: Claire Danes; Damian Lewis; Morena Baccarin; David Harewood; Diego Klattenhoff; Jackson Pace; Morgan Saylor; Mandy Patinkin
- No. of episodes: 12

Release
- Original network: Showtime
- Original release: October 2 – December 18, 2011

Season chronology
- Next → Season 2

The first season of the American television drama series Homeland premiered on October 2, 2011, on Showtime and concluded on December 18, 2011, consisting of 12 episodes. The series is loosely based on the Israeli television series Prisoners of War created by Gideon Raff and is developed for American television by Howard Gordon and Alex Gansa. The first season follows Carrie Mathison, a CIA operations officer who has come to believe that Nicholas Brody, a U.S. Marine Sergeant, who was held captive by al-Qaeda as a prisoner of war, was turned by the enemy and now poses a significant risk to national security.

The season received universal acclaim, scoring a Metacritic rating of 92 out of 100 from 28 critics. TV Guide named it the best TV show of 2011 and highly applauded the performances by Damian Lewis and Claire Danes. Metacritic determined Homeland to be the second-best TV show of 2011 according to major TV critics, by aggregating the critics' year-end top ten lists. The series won both the Golden Globe Award for Best Television Series – Drama and the Primetime Emmy Award for Outstanding Drama Series for this season.

The original broadcast of the pilot episode on October 2, 2011, received 1.08 million viewers, becoming Showtime's highest-rated drama premiere in eight years. The episode received a total of 2.78 million viewers with additional broadcasts and on demand views. The finale episode of season one received 1.7 million viewers, making it the most-watched season finale of any first-year Showtime series. The series also performed well in the UK, where it aired on Channel 4, with the pilot episode drawing 3.10 million viewers, and the finale drawing 4.01 million viewers.

== Cast ==
=== Main ===
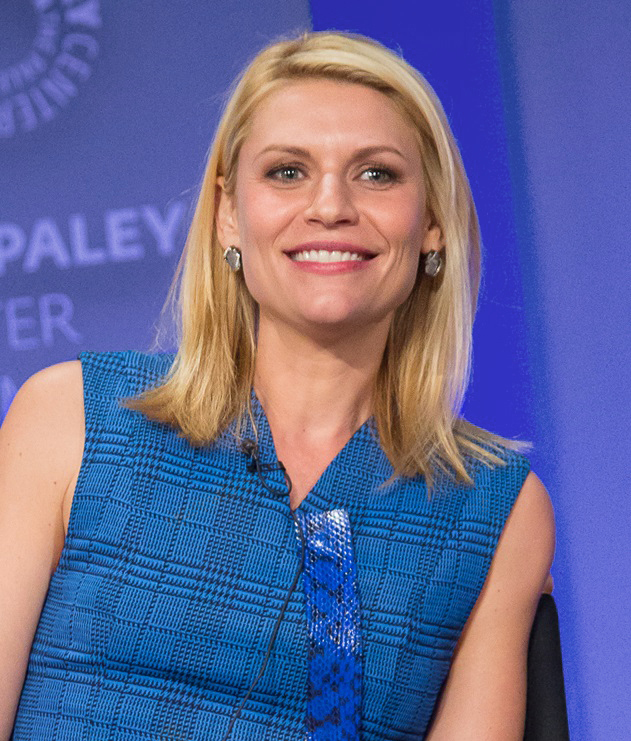
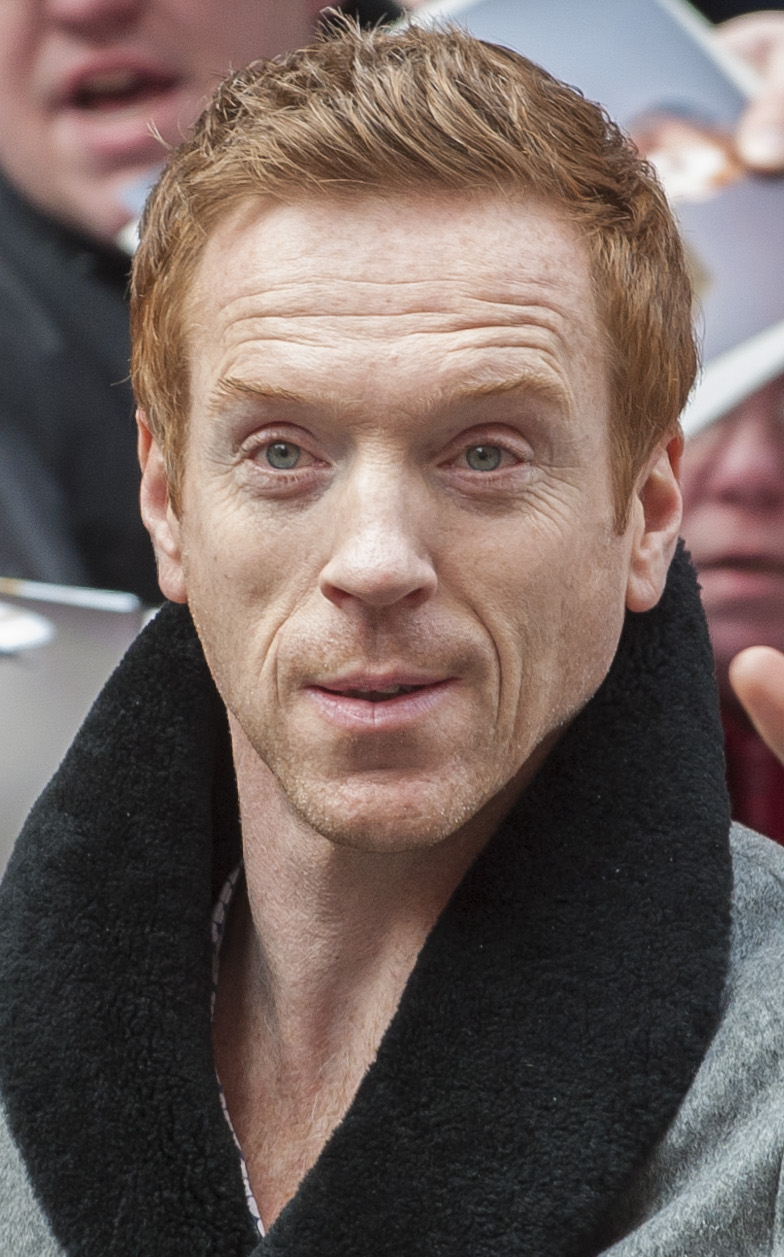
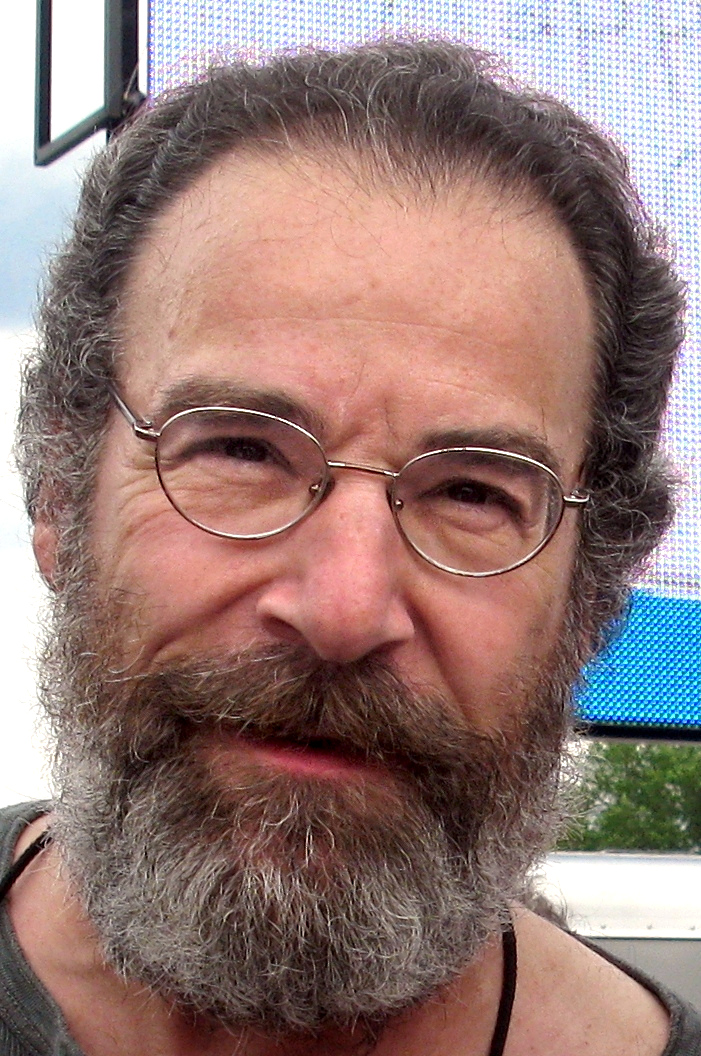
Claire Danes, Damian Lewis and Mandy Patinkin (left to right) portray lead roles Carrie Mathison, Nicholas Brody and Saul Berenson, respectively.
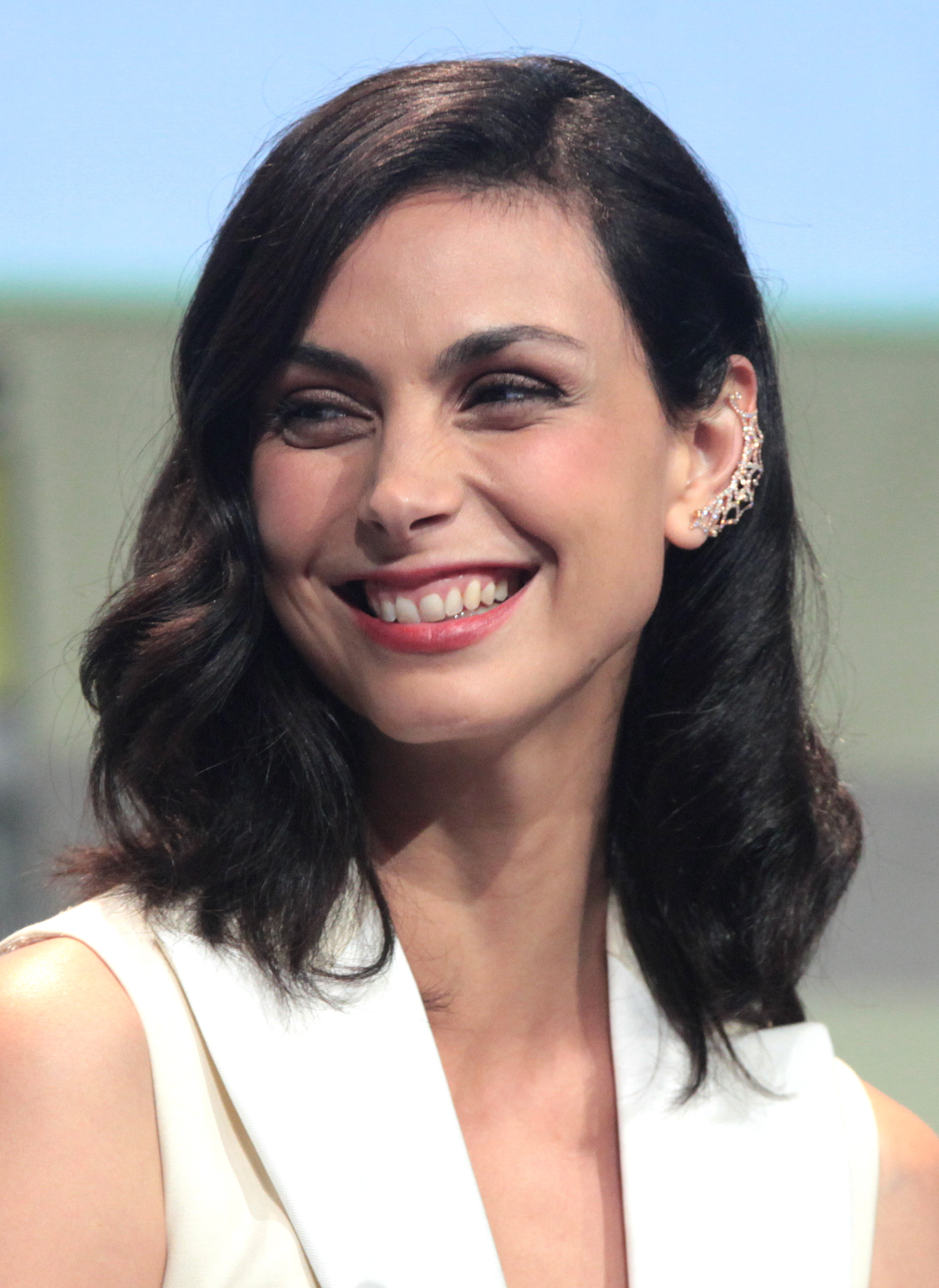
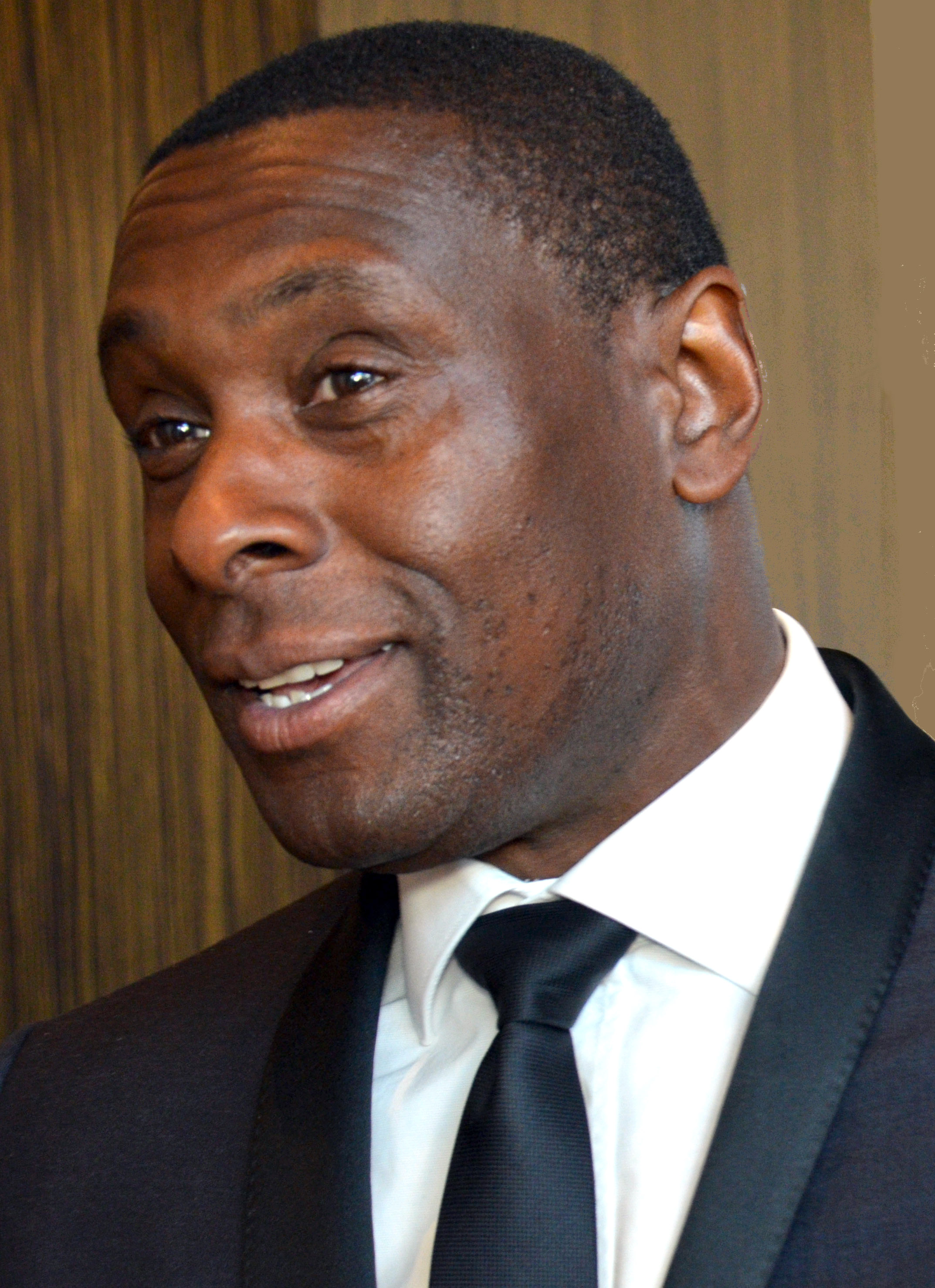
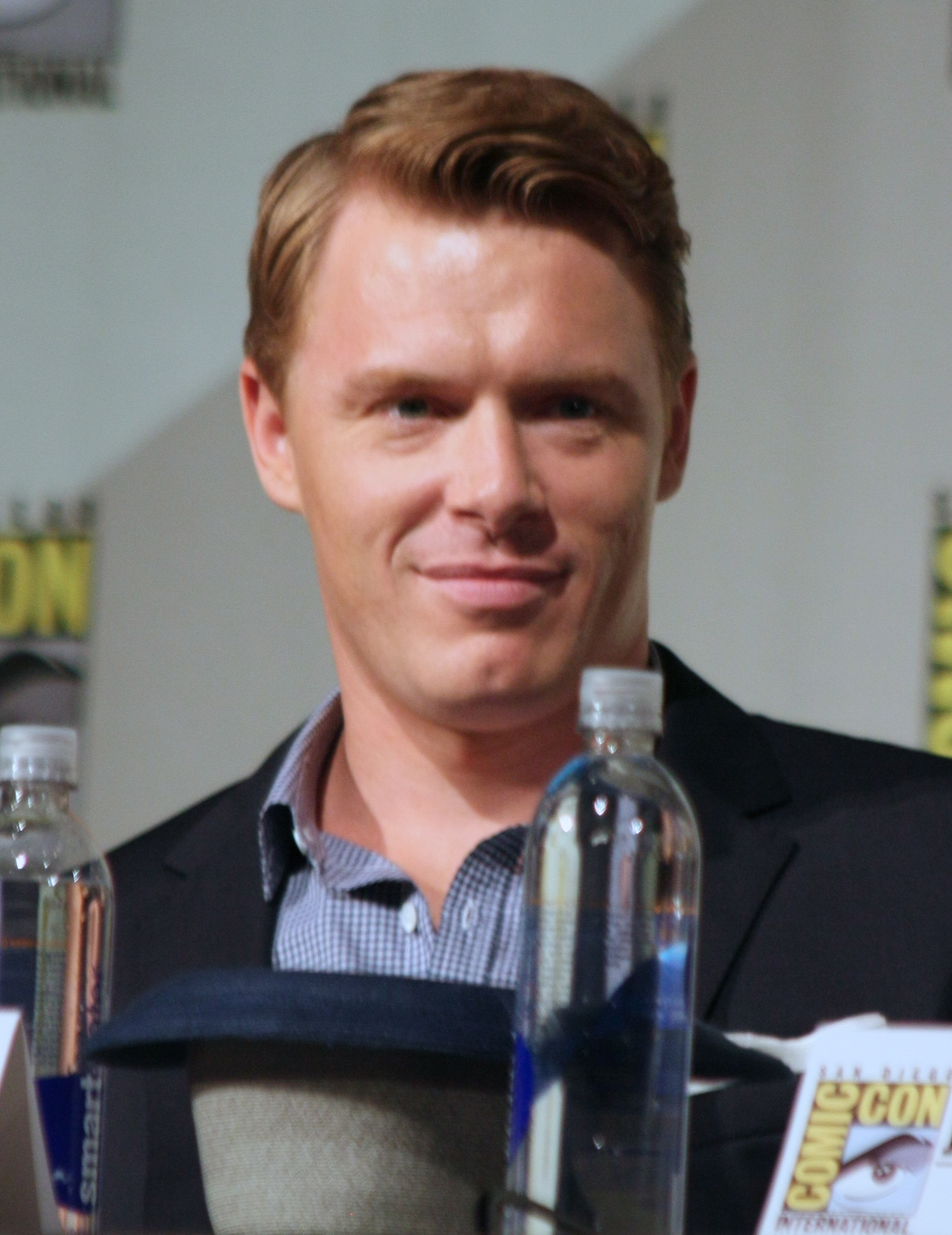
Morena Baccarin, David Harewood and Diego Klattenhoff (left to right) portray Jessica Brody, David Estes and Mike Faber, respectively.
- Claire Danes as Carrie Mathison, a CIA operations officer assigned to the Counterterrorism Center
- Damian Lewis as Nicholas Brody, a U.S. Marine sergeant who was rescued by Delta Force after being held by al-Qaeda as a prisoner of war for eight years
- Morena Baccarin as Jessica Brody, Nicholas Brody's wife
- David Harewood as David Estes, the Director of the CIA's Counterterrorism Center and Carrie's boss
- Diego Klattenhoff as Mike Faber, a U.S. Marine Captain. He was Nicholas' best friend who, assuming he was dead, started having an affair with Jessica Brody.
- Jackson Pace as Chris Brody, Nicholas Brody's son
- Morgan Saylor as Dana Brody, Nicholas Brody's daughter
- Mandy Patinkin as Saul Berenson, the CIA's Middle-East Division Chief and Carrie's old boss and mentor

=== Recurring ===
- Jamey Sheridan as William Walden, Vice President of the United States and former director of the CIA
- Navid Negahban as Abu Nazir, a high-ranking member of al-Qaeda
- David Marciano as Virgil Piotrowski, Carrie's contact aiding in the surveillance of Brody
- Maury Sterling as Max Piotrowski, Virgil's brother who also aids in the surveillance of Brody
- Afton Williamson as Helen Walker, Tom Walker's wife
- Amy Hargreaves as Maggie Mathison, Carrie's older sister and a psychiatrist
- Alok Tewari as Latif Bin Walid
- Omid Abtahi as Raqim Faisel, Aileen's husband who is also part of a sleeper cell
- Marin Ireland as Aileen Morgan, an anti-American terrorist part of a sleeper cell
- Hrach Titizian as Danny Galvez, a CIA agent of Guatemalan and Lebanese origin
- Sarita Choudhury as Mira Berenson, Saul's wife who is often out of the country
- Chris Chalk as Tom Walker, a U.S. Marine who was captured along with Brody
- Ramsey Faragallah as Mansour Al-Zahrani

=== Guest ===
- Nestor Serrano as Major General Tony Trujillo
- Scott Bryce as Major Foster
- Amir Arison as Prince Farid Bin Abbud
- Brianna Brown as Lynne Reed, a CIA informant
- Melissa Benoist as Stacy Moore
- Michael McKean as Judge Jeffrey Turner
- Lawrence O'Donnell as himself
- Gaby Hoffmann as a CNN producer
- Annika Boras as Jessica's friend
- James Rebhorn as Frank Mathison, Carrie's father
- Waleed Zuaiter as Afsal Hamid
- James Urbaniak as Larry
- Sherman Howard as Chip Shooter Haigh
- Marc Menchaca as Lauder Wakefield, a former Marine
- Reggie Austin as Matt
- Jaden Harmon as Lucas Walker
- Linda Purl as Elizabeth Gaines, the Vice President's chief advisor
- Sammy Sheik as Imam Rafan Gohar
- Billy Smith as Special Agent Hall
- Rohan Chand as Issa Nazir
- Trent Dawson as Kyle Galyean
- Remy Auberjonois as William Pritchar
- Nasser Faris as Bassel "The Tailor"
- Charles Borland as Sanders
- Elizabeth Franz as Isabel Samler
- Larry Pine as Richard Halsted

== Episodes ==
No. overall	No. in season	Title	Directed by	Written by	Original release date	Prod. code	U.S. viewers (millions)
1	1	"Pilot"	Michael Cuesta	Howard Gordon & Alex Gansa & Gideon Raff	October 2, 2011	1WAH79	1.08
Carrie Mathison, working as a CIA case officer in Iraq, is told by an informant prior to his execution that an American prisoner of war has been turned by al-Qaeda. Ten months later, Carrie is working in the CIA's counterterrorism office in the United States, where she learns that Marine Sergeant Nicholas Brody has been rescued from an al-Qaeda compound eight years after going missing. Carrie concludes that Brody is the turned POW and begins illegally surveilling his household. Brody reunites with his wife, Jessica, and children Dana and Chris, unaware that Jessica has begun a relationship with Brody's friend and fellow Marine Mike Faber. Carrie discovers evidence that Brody may be communicating coded messages in his televised appearances, and shares this with Saul Berenson, her mentor and former boss at the CIA. Brody meets with the widow of Tom Walker, the other Marine captured alongside him, and claims to have not been present during Walker's death. However, Brody is later shown to remember beating Walker to death under command from al-Qaeda leader Abu Nazir.
2	2	"Grace"	Michael Cuesta	Story by : Alex Gansa; Teleplay by : Alexander Cary	October 9, 2011	1WAH01	0.94
Saul obtains a warrant temporarily legalizing Carrie's surveillance of Brody. Carrie meets with Lynne Reed, a CIA informant working as a consort for the Saudi Arabian Prince Farid Bin Abbud, and learns that she has video evidence of the Prince meeting with Abu Nazir. CIA deputy director David Estes denies Carrie's request to put a security detail on Lynne and instead requests that she download the content of the Prince's phone. Carrie visits her sister Maggie, a psychiatrist, to receive anti-psychotic medication, believing that undergoing formal treatment would end her security clearance at the CIA. Carrie is unable to watch Brody's garage, since her surveillance team failed to install cameras there. Brody is revealed to have converted to Islam and is seen going to his garage to recite Muslim prayer in private. He later emerges to the press in full uniform, ready to embrace his public stardom.
3	3	"Clean Skin"	Dan Attias	Chip Johannessen	October 16, 2011	1WAH02	1.08
Brody and his family prepare for a TV interview. Brody omits details of how Abu Nazir offered him food and comfort amidst his torture. Lynne manages to discreetly download the contents of Prince Farid's phone, but the data is of no use. That night, with no CIA security detail protecting her, Lynne is assassinated while at a nightclub with the Prince's entourage, and a diamond necklace she received as a gift from the Prince is removed from her person. The necklace is later sold for $400,000, consistent with Saul's observation that jewelry is often used to quickly transfer funds relating to terrorist activity. A young couple is seen purchasing a house in proximity to an airport.
4	4	"Semper I"	Jeffrey Nachmanoff	Howard Gordon & Alex Gansa	October 23, 2011	1WAH03	1.10
Brody is promoted to the rank of gunnery sergeant amidst his recent wave of public appearances, prompting talk of having him run for public office. Carrie's surveillance warrant on Brody expires and she is forced to uninstall her recording equipment from his home. The CIA begin investigating a number of potential recipients of the money transfer via Prince Farid's sold diamond necklace. Carrie and her team begin investigating Raqim Faisel, the man who bought the house near the airport with his girlfriend, Aileen Morgan. Brody shoots a deer during a dinner party at his house; Jessica admonishes him over his erratic behavior and demands that he seek counseling. The next night, Carrie, stripped of her surveillance cameras, follows Brody to a veterans' support group meeting and gets his attention. Brody recognizes her from the debriefing; the two instantly bond and have a flirtatious conversation.
5	5	"Blind Spot"	Clark Johnson	Alexander Cary	October 30, 2011	1WAH04	1.28
The CIA detain Afsal Hamid, the lone survivor of the raid on the al-Qaeda compound where Brody was rescued. Carrie summons Brody to consult on Hamid's interrogation; Brody recognizes Hamid as his guard while in captivity. Hamid gives up an email address belonging to a university where Raqim Faisel is employed. With this, the CIA are soon able to locate Raqim's home address, but find it vacated upon arrival. Brody meets with Estes and demands an opportunity to confront Hamid, his torturer, face-to-face. Hamid provokes Brody into physically attacking him, and is later found to have killed himself in his cell using a razor blade. Carrie suspects that Brody slipped the blade to Hamid during their altercation, but Saul is unable to report these findings up the chain of command given the lack of evidence.
6	6	"The Good Soldier"	Brad Turner	Henry Bromell	November 6, 2011	1WAH05	1.33
In an attempt to find out who helped Hamid kill himself, Carrie has a polygraph administered to everyone who was in contact with Hamid, including Brody. Raqim and Aileen discover that al-Qaeda is also attempting to eliminate them; Raqim is later killed, while Aileen manages to escape. The CIA begin tracking Aileen. After Walker's funeral, Brody attacks Mike over his affair with Jessica. He calls Carrie to a bar that night to socialize; the two get drunk and end up having sex, but not before Carrie reveals the purpose of the polygraph test to Brody. The next day, Brody passes every question on his polygraph, including whether he slipped Hamid the razor. Carrie requests that Brody be asked whether he has ever been unfaithful to his wife; Brody says no, and passes the polygraph. Carrie realizes that Brody is a skilled liar, though Saul believes he is no longer a suspect. Outside the CIA office, Brody has Carrie get in his car, and the two drive off.
7	7	"The Weekend"	Michael Cuesta	Meredith Stiehm	November 13, 2011	1WAH06	1.42
Carrie and Brody drive to her family's remote cabin and enjoy a day of sex and romance. Aileen attempts to flee to Mexico, but Saul intercepts her and drives her back to Langley. She discloses that her task was to buy a home near the airport and await a visitor, who spent an hour on the roof. The roof is discovered to have a direct line of sight to a landing pad for Marine One, the President's helicopter, within a sniper's range. At the cabin the following morning, Carrie inadvertently indicates to Brody that she has been spying on him, prompting him to confront her. Carrie accuses Brody of being an agent of al-Qaeda; Brody maintains his innocence, but admits that he converted to Islam, that he beat Walker to death under coercion, and that he harbored an affection for Abu Nazir during his captivity. Saul calls Carrie and reports that Aileen has identified the "visitor" at her house as Tom Walker, who is revealed to be both alive as well as the POW turned by al-Qaeda. A shocked Carrie attempts to apologize to Brody, but he rebuffs her and drives away.
8	8	"Achilles Heel"	Tucker Gates	Chip Johannessen	November 20, 2011	1WAH07	1.20
The CIA inform Tom Walker's family (but not Brody) that Walker is still alive. Walker is shown to be homeless in Washington, D.C.; he receives a key and note from Mansour al-Zahrani, a Saudi diplomat. Walker is discovered to be routinely calling his family to hear their voices; the FBI traces the next call between Walker and his wife Helen, but Helen warns him to run. The FBI chases Walker through a mosque where they accidentally kill two attendees; Walker uses his key and note to retrieve a sniper rifle from a storage unit. Carrie visits Brody and reveals that Walker is alive and working for al-Qaeda; that night, Brody attacks al-Zahrani at his home and tells him that he is done talking to Abu Nazir, revealing that he has remained in contact with Nazir despite proclaiming his innocence.
9	9	"Crossfire"	Jeffrey Nachmanoff	Alexander Cary	November 27, 2011	1WAH08	1.35
In flashbacks to three years ago, Abu Nazir is shown to have ended Brody's torture, given him comfortable living quarters, and placed him in charge of teaching English to Nazir's young son Issa. Over time, Brody developed a fatherly love for Issa, until Issa's school was destroyed by an American drone strike that killed Issa and several other children. Vice President Walden claimed that any images of dead children were terrorist propaganda, enraging Brody. In the present, the CIA identify Mansour al-Zahrani as Walker's handler, but Carrie and Saul are limited in their options given al-Zahrani's diplomatic immunity. Brody is kidnapped by Nazir's men and put on a video call with Nazir himself, who reminds Brody of his commitment to al-Qaeda's mission. Al-Zahrani enters and instructs Brody to accept an offer from Vice President Walden to run for public office.
10	10	"Representative Brody"	Guy Ferland	Henry Bromell	December 4, 2011	1WAH09	1.22
Vice President Walden offers Brody a chance to run for the House of Representatives in an upcoming special election; Brody accepts. Carrie and Saul interrogate al-Zahrani and arrange for him to meet Walker at Farragut Square the next day. Brody visits Carrie at her home and informs her of his bid for public office, having come to confirm that no one knows of their affair. During the planned meet with al-Zahrani the next day, Walker remotely detonates a bomb inside a briefcase belonging to a lookalike, killing al-Zahrani and several bystanders, and giving Carrie a concussion. Saul visits Carrie at the hospital, and the two conclude that there must be a mole inside the government. At the same time, Brody announces his candidacy on television.
11	11	"The Vest"	Clark Johnson	Meredith Stiehm & Chip Johannessen	December 11, 2011	1WAH10	1.32
Saul finds Carrie in a manic, delirious state after a week of recovery in the hospital, and learns from her sister Maggie that she has bipolar disorder. Saul stays with Carrie at her home while her medication takes effect, and helps her produce a detailed timeline of Abu Nazir's activity. Brody takes his family on a trip to Gettysburg, where he secretly meets with an al-Qaeda contact at the back of a clothing store and receives an explosive suicide vest tailored to him. Carrie identifies a period in her timeline when Abu Nazir was inactive (which, unbeknownst to her, coincides with Issa's death). She calls Brody, who offers to come over and discuss it; however, Estes arrives instead, and reveals that Brody disclosed details of their affair and her illegal surveillance of the Brody family. He confiscates Carrie's classified documents and suspends her from the CIA.
12	12	"Marine One"	Michael Cuesta	Story by : Alex Gansa & Howard Gordon; Teleplay by : Alex Gansa & Chip Johannessen	December 18, 2011	1WAH11	1.71
Brody records a video explaining his impending attack on the Vice President. The following day, Walden and other lawmakers convene at the State Department for a policy summit, which Brody attends while wearing the suicide vest. Walker snipes at the crowd and kills three people; Walden, Brody, Estes and others are ushered into a bunker. Carrie realizes that the shooting is a diversion to get the Vice President and other high-value targets in the same room as Brody, who is to carry out the actual attack. Carrie drives to the Brody household and frantically warns Dana about her father's plans. Brody, seconds from detonating the vest, relents upon hearing his daughter's pleas to come home. Brody secretly meets with Walker that night and tells Nazir over the phone that he can now act as al-Qaeda's mole inside the White House. Nazir has Brody kill Walker. Carrie decides to undergo electroconvulsive therapy for her bipolar disorder; right before she is rendered unconscious by her anesthesia, she remembers Brody calling out Issa's name in his sleep at the cabin, and realizes that the two had a connection.

== Plot ==
The first season follows Carrie Mathison, a Central Intelligence Agency operations officer who, after conducting an unauthorized operation in Iraq, is put on probation and reassigned to the CIA's Counterterrorism Center in Langley, Virginia. In Iraq, Carrie was warned by an asset that an American prisoner of war had been turned by al-Qaeda. Carrie has also been diagnosed with bipolar disorder, a fact that she conceals from the CIA. She surreptitiously receives medication for the disorder from her sister.

Carrie's job grows complicated when her boss, Director of the Counterterrorism Center David Estes, calls Carrie and her colleagues in for an emergency briefing. Carrie learns that Nicholas Brody, a U.S. Marine Sergeant who had been reported as missing in action since 2003, has been rescued during a Delta Force raid on a compound belonging to terrorist Abu Nazir. Carrie comes to believe that Brody is the American prisoner of war whom her asset in Iraq was talking about. However, the federal government and her superiors at the CIA consider Brody a war hero. Later, another Marine captured at the same time, Tom Walker, is also found to be still alive, casting doubt on which of the Marines is the suspected spy.

Realizing it would be nearly impossible to convince her boss to place Brody under surveillance, Carrie approaches the only other person she can trust, her mentor, Saul Berenson. The two must now work together to investigate Brody and prevent another terrorist attack on American soil. Eventually, Brody plans to assassinate the Vice President with a suicide vest but falters at the last moment after an emotional conversation with his daughter Dana. Carrie becomes more paranoid that Brody plans to carry out a terroristic act.

== Reception ==
On Rotten Tomatoes, the season has an approval rating of 100% with an average score of 9.3 out of 10 based on 32 reviews. The website's critical consensus reads, "Homeland is an addictive, politically resonant spy thriller and compelling character study that benefits from superb performances." The first season scored a Metacritic rating of 92 out of 100 from 28 critics. TV Guide named it the best TV show of 2011 and highly applauded the performances by Damian Lewis and Claire Danes. Metacritic determined Homeland to be the second-best TV show of 2011 according to major TV critics, by aggregating the critics' year-end top-ten lists.

Hank Stuever of The Washington Post gave the pilot episode an A−, saying "What makes Homeland rise above other post-9/11 dramas is Danes's stellar performance as Carrie — easily this season's strongest female character," and that "The latter half of the first episode is exhilarating. I'm hooked." Matthew Gilbert of The Boston Globe said it was his favorite drama pilot of the season, giving it an A. Entertainment Weekly's Ken Tucker gave it an A−, stating "It's the fall season's most intriguing, tense puzzler." IGN TV gave it a positive review, saying that it was an "ace thriller" that also managed to have something to say about the "war on terror". The seventh episode, "The Weekend", was described by both the creators of the show and Damian Lewis as a "watershed" episode.

Former US President Barack Obama has praised the show.

== Home media release ==
Homeland: The Complete First Season was released as a widescreen region 1 four-disc DVD and three-disc Blu-ray box set in the United States and Canada on August 28, 2012. In addition to all 12 episodes that had aired, it includes audio commentary on the pilot episode, deleted scenes, "Homeland Season One: Under Surveillance" featurette, and "Week Ten: A Prologue to Season 2" featurette. The same set was also released on September 10, 2012, in region 2.
