= Marine One (Homeland) =

- Homeland episode
- Episode no.: Season 1 Episode 12
- Directed by: Michael Cuesta
- Story by: Alex Gansa; Howard Gordon
- Teleplay by: Alex Gansa; Chip Johannessen
- Production code: 1WAH11
- Original air date: December 18, 2011
- Running time: 85 minutes

Guest appearances
- Chris Chalk as Tom Walker; Navid Negahban as Abu Nazir; Jamey Sheridan as William Walden; David Marciano as Virgil; Amy Hargreaves as Maggie Mathison; Hrach Titizian as Danny Galvez; Linda Purl as Elizabeth Gaines; Larry Pine as Richard Halsted

Episode chronology
| ← Previous "The Vest" | Next → "The Smile" |
- Homeland season 1

"Marine One" is the first-season finale of the television series Homeland. It originally aired on Showtime on December 18, 2011. The extended 85-minute episode sees the culmination of Abu Nazir's terrorist plot at the Vice President's summit, while Carrie Mathison's downward spiral continues.

The season finale was highly acclaimed by critics and with 1.71 million viewers was the highest rated finale ever for a Showtime first-year series.

== Plot ==
=== Day one ===
Nicholas Brody (Damian Lewis) records a videotape of himself, explaining his future actions as an attack against a domestic threat — namely Vice President Walden (Jamey Sheridan) and his advisors, whom Brody blames for the deaths of 82 children during a drone strike in Pakistan. He leaves the camera's memory card at a drop-off point. Meanwhile, a depressed Carrie Mathison (Claire Danes) is visited by Saul Berenson (Mandy Patinkin). Carrie implores Saul to follow up on her investigation into Abu Nazir (Navid Negahban). She also wonders aloud why Brody betrayed her by turning her in, leading Saul to realize that Carrie is in love with Brody.

That night, Tom Walker (Chris Chalk) commandeers an apartment overlooking the State Department, which is the site of the Vice President Walden's upcoming policy summit. After subduing the apartment's resident, Walker sets up a vantage point at the window for his sniper attack. Meanwhile, in his garage, Brody is discovered by Dana (Morgan Saylor) as he conducts a Muslim prayer ritual. Brody admits to Dana that he converted to Islam while he was in captivity and asks her to keep it a secret from the rest of the family.

=== Day two ===
Saul presents David Estes (David Harewood) with a heavily redacted CIA document, believing it to concern a drone strike against Nazir. Estes dismisses the document and tells Saul to focus on protecting Vice President Walden. Brody gets dressed for the summit, concealing his explosive vest under his Marine uniform. Dana, well aware of her father's bizarre behavior, becomes uneasy and asks him not to go. Upon hearing about the summit on the radio, Carrie recognizes it as a possible target for Walker and Nazir. She asks Virgil (David Marciano) to drive her there. At the summit, Carrie witnesses Brody's arrival.

As lawmakers convene in front of the State Department, Walker opens fire. Walden's chief aide, Elizabeth Gaines (Linda Purl), is shot in the back and killed. As Walker continues to fire into the crowd, the surviving VIPs are rushed into a secure bunker beneath the Harry S Truman Building. In the chaos, Brody is dragged past the building's metal detectors (since his suicide vest contained metal ball bearings it would have been detected). He finds himself in the bunker with Walden, Estes, and other high-ranking officials.

Outside, Carrie contacts Saul and tells him that Walker's sniper attack is merely a diversion from the terrorist's actual attack. During the conversation, Carrie realizes that Brody has been sequestered with Walden, and tries to tell Saul that the elimination of the Vice President and the other high-value targets is the true goal of the attack. However, Saul believes that Carrie's obsession with Brody is resurfacing. After dismissing her theory, Saul sends Secret Service agents to contain her. Carrie figures out what is happening and escapes in Virgil's van.

Inside the bunker, Brody approaches Walden and attempts to detonate his explosive vest, only to find that the device has become disabled owing to disconnected wires. He retreats into a bathroom stall and works on repairing the vest. Meanwhile, Carrie arrives at Brody's house and encounters Dana, urging her to call her father and talk him out of the attack. However, Dana dials 911 and reports Carrie to the police. After Carrie is confronted by Jessica (Morena Baccarin), she is placed under arrest.

After repairing the vest, Brody prepares to enter the bunker and carry out the attack. However, he receives a call from Dana, who tells him about Carrie's accusations and insists that Brody tell her that he will be returning home that night. After much agonizing, Brody makes the promise and forgoes detonating the vest. When an all clear is given, Brody and the other dignitaries start to file out of the bunker.

=== Day three ===
Saul meets with Vice President Walden. He demands to know the story behind the covered-up drone strike, and has brought along a big bargaining chip in the form of evidence that Walden authorized torture when he was head of the CIA. As Walden cannot allow that to be publicized, Saul is shown footage of Walden and Estes ordering the drone strike that killed 82 children, which was deemed to be acceptable collateral damage in their attempt to kill Abu Nazir.

Carrie is released from police custody. Her sister Maggie (Amy Hargreaves) is there to pick her up, but Brody is also there to confront her. He reiterates to Carrie that he is not a terrorist, and berates her for terrifying his family and continuing to harass him. This conversation is Carrie's breaking point: With her life and career in a shambles, she now even doubts her own sanity, as nothing came out of her theory about Brody (she has no idea she actually stopped his attack). Clearly in distress, she stumbles into her sister's car and asks to be taken to the hospital.

That night, Brody goes to retrieve the recording he dropped off, but it is gone. He goes home, gets his gun, and goes to meet Walker, who does not believe the vest did not work and pulls a gun on Brody. Walker has Abu Nazir on his cell phone, who wants to talk to Brody. Brody explains to Nazir that his vest malfunctioned, but that maybe it is a good thing that it did, as he is now a trusted ally of the man who is going to be the next President, and will be able to influence him. Nazir seems amenable but tells Brody that he must eliminate the "wild card." Brody shoots Walker in the head.

=== Two days later ===
Saul barges into Carrie's hospital room, where she is being prepared for electroconvulsive therapy (ECT) in hopes of treating her bipolar disorder. Saul tries to put a stop to the procedure, but Carrie is undeterred, feeling that she has no choice with her life in ruin. She mentions that short-term memory loss is a side effect, but it is usually temporary. Saul tells her she was wrong about Brody but right about Abu Nazir; Walden ordered a drone strike that killed 82 children, including Abu Nazir's youngest son. Carrie is anesthetized before beginning the ECT. As she begins to fall asleep, she recalls the moment where Brody was shouting Issa's name in his sleep. She now realizes that Brody had a connection with Abu Nazir's dead son. However, the thoughts are fleeting as she falls asleep and the doctors begin the ECT, which induces a seizure in Carrie.

== Production ==
The episode's story was conceived by executive producers Alex Gansa and Howard Gordon, while the teleplay was written by Gansa and co-executive producer Chip Johannessen. Executive producer Michael Cuesta directed the episode.

The episode was structured to have a quiet first act, a frenetic second act, and then a quiet third act. This is reflected in the cinematography — the first and third acts are filmed with still cameras, while the second act is filmed entirely with handhelds.

== Reception ==
=== Ratings ===
The original broadcast received 1.71 million viewers, which made it Homeland's highest rated episode of the season, up 58% from the season premiere. In addition, it was Showtime's highest rated season finale ever for a freshman series.

=== Reviews ===
The season finale was highly acclaimed by critics. Out of 24 reviews of the episode indexed by Metacritic, 23 were positive and one was 'mixed'. Michael Hogan of The Huffington Post called "Marine One" "a monumentally satisfying, forward-leaning episode, one that resolved many of our most burning questions while leaving plenty of room for future drama". TIME's James Poniewozik said it was a "tautly constricted and brilliantly acted episode". Andy Greenwald of Grantland.com hailed it as "a thrilling and devastating conclusion to what has been a supremely artful season of television".

Both Damian Lewis and Claire Danes received extremely high marks for their performances in the finale. HitFix's Alan Sepinwall said this should surely be Damian Lewis' Emmy submission episode and that his acting was "raw, magnetic, unflinching, mesmerizing". Maureen Ryan of The Huffington Post thought the two leads delivered "breathtaking performances" and said "I don't think I've ever seen anyone portray vulnerability and pain as well as Claire Danes; she projected Carrie's deep depression like a force field of weighty despair".

Strikes against the episode were generally considered to be a lack of resolution, and some major contrivances in the climactic bunker scene. Matt Roush of TV Guide praised the episode but said the resolution to the bunker scene was "awfully convenient, not as satisfying a twist as we're used to from this taut thriller", but that "it does reflect Homeland's unusually emotional context".

=== Accolades ===
Damian Lewis won the Primetime Emmy Award for Outstanding Lead Actor in a Drama Series for his performance in this submitted episode at the 64th Primetime Emmy Awards.
