= Grace (Homeland) =

- Homeland episode
- Episode no.: Season 1 Episode 2
- Directed by: Michael Cuesta
- Story by: Alex Gansa
- Teleplay by: Alexander Cary
- Production code: 1WAH01
- Original air date: October 9, 2011
- Running time: 50 minutes

Guest appearances
- David Marciano as Virgil; Maury Sterling as Max; Navid Negahban as Abu Nazir; Amy Hargreaves as Maggie Mathison; Scott Bryce as Major Foster; Amir Arison as Prince Farid Bin Abbud; Brianna Brown as Lynne Reed; Melissa Benoist as Stacy Moore; Alok Tewari as Latif Bin Walid; Michael McKean as Judge Jeffrey Turner

Episode chronology
← Previous "Pilot"	Next → "Clean Skin"
- Homeland season 1

"Grace" is the second episode of the first season of the psychological thriller television series Homeland. It originally aired on Showtime on October 9, 2011.

Brody begins to exhibit signs of post-traumatic stress disorder. Carrie continues to spy on Brody and gets a new lead on Abu Nazir's activity.

== Plot ==
Brody (Damian Lewis) wakes up in a panic from a nightmare in which he was commanded by his al-Qaeda captors to bury his friend Tom Walker. He lies in bed sobbing while Carrie (Claire Danes) watches and takes notes from her home. The next morning, Jessica (Morena Baccarin) shows Brody that her arm has bruises all over it; while sleeping, he had grabbed her arm and was shouting in Arabic. His wife and kids go out and Brody is left alone for the day. He sinks into the corner of his bedroom and sits there in silence for the entire day, as though he is back in his cell in Iraq.

Saul (Mandy Patinkin) visits a judge he has history with (Michael McKean). He apparently has some leverage over this judge and asks to be granted a FISA warrant, in order to make Carrie's surveillance of Brody technically legal. The judge reluctantly agrees. Saul also checks in with the CIA cryptography team, who were not able to decode Brody's coded message, if indeed it were a coded message. Saul then presents Carrie with the warrant temporarily legalizing her surveillance, which will be valid for four weeks. Carrie reports Brody's disturbing behavior to Saul, who says that if Brody had indeed been turned, then he would be embracing the hero role in the media.

Lynne Reed (Brianna Brown), a consort of Prince Farid Bin Abbud (Amir Arison) of Saudi Arabia, is interviewing young women in Washington D.C. for the Prince's harem. She calls up a spa to make an appointment. In fact, the call is received by a CIA duty officer, who reports the call to Carrie, revealing that Lynne is a CIA informant working for Carrie. The next day, Carrie meets up with Lynne at the spa. Lynne reveals that she has recorded footage of Prince Farid meeting with Abu Nazir. Carrie reports these developments to David Estes (David Harewood) and requests agency protection for Lynne. Estes is pleased with the lead but denies the protection. He tells Carrie that Lynne needs to download the contents of the Prince's phone.

Brody is in the kitchen when he spots a reporter lurking in his backyard. He goes out and tells the reporter he has ten seconds to get off his property. The reporter takes the opportunity to start asking Brody some questions instead. Brody violently strikes him in the throat while son Chris (Jackson Pace) watches in horror. Brody, looking disoriented, wanders off, eventually arriving at a mall. He enters a hardware store and browses for a while before eventually grabbing a small carpet. When Brody arrives home that night, he enters the garage and drops off his bag from the hardware store. Carrie and Virgil (David Marciano) are watching, but Virgil admits that they did not install any cameras in the garage. Mike (Diego Klattenhoff) talks to Brody after dinner, encouraging him to re-enlist, when he will be given a promotion and financially taken care of. Brody is insulted at the offer; he can tell that the higher-ups put Mike up to making this pitch, and that they want Brody to be the "poster boy". He angrily declares that his days of taking orders from the U.S. Government are over.

Lynne is leaving a hotel when she is bumped into by Virgil, who on purpose spills tea on her. She goes to the bathroom to clean up, where Carrie is waiting for her. She gives Lynne the device needed to download the Prince's phone data hidden in a makeup compact. Carrie tries to set Lynne at ease, lying to her that Lynne is under 24/7 protection.

Carrie visits her sister Maggie (Amy Hargreaves). Maggie is a psychiatrist and has been pilfering samples of an anti-psychotic medication to give to Carrie. Maggie expresses concern that she is jeopardizing her own practice by doing so, but Carrie says she has no other option, as if she pursued any kind of treatment on her own, her secret would be out and she would surely lose her security clearance with the CIA. Maggie gives her a week's supply of pills.

A flashback is shown of Brody's time as a prisoner. Brody emerges from his cell and seems surprised by the fact that he is able to walk freely about the compound. He encounters a room full of worshipers in the middle of Muslim prayer and stops to watch them. Back in the present day, Brody heads to his garage. He puts his newly purchased carpet down on the floor and kneels down on it; he begins to pray, reciting Al-Fatiha from the Quran. Later that day, Brody goes outside in full uniform to talk to all of the media camped out in front of his house. Carrie is watching the cameras and excitedly calls Saul and tells him "It's happening, exactly like you said. He's out there playing the hero card!"

== Production ==
The episode's teleplay was written by co-executive producer Alexander Cary, with story credit going to series co-creator Alex Gansa. Executive producer Michael Cuesta directed the episode, his second of four episodes he directed in the first season.

== Trivia ==
In this episode when Brody is kneeling over the grave and singing the "Marines' Hymn", he sings "First to fight for right and country" and "We are proud to bear the title". The correct lyrics of the "Marines' Hymn" are "First to fight for right and freedom" and "We are proud to claim the title".

The painting Saul comments on during his meeting with the judge is Mending the Nets by Dutch-Jewish painter Jozef Israëls.

The killing of Osama bin Ladin was referenced as part of the plot. Bin Ladin was killed while this episode was in production.

== Reception ==
=== Ratings ===
The original broadcast had 940,000 viewers, down about 10% from the pilot episode.

=== Reviews ===
Scott Collura of IGN gave "Grace" an 8/10 score, and praised the development of the two lead characters. Alan Sepinwall of HitFix felt that this episode successfully maintained the promise and high quality of the pilot.
