= Representative Brody =

- Homeland episode
- Episode no.: Season 1 Episode 10
- Directed by: Guy Ferland
- Written by: Henry Bromell
- Production code: 1WAH09
- Original air date: December 4, 2011
- Running time: 48 minutes

Guest appearances
- Chris Chalk as Tom Walker; Jamey Sheridan as William Walden; David Marciano as Virgil; Ramsey Faragallah as Mansour Al-Zahrani

Episode chronology
← Previous "Crossfire"	Next → "The Vest"
- Homeland season 1

"Representative Brody" is the tenth episode of the first season of the psychological thriller television series Homeland. It was originally shown on Showtime on December 4, 2011.

Brody is approached with an opportunity for a Congress seat. In an attempt to close in on Walker, the CIA targets the diplomat who made contact with him.

== Plot ==
Vice President Walden (Jamey Sheridan) visits Brody (Damian Lewis) at his home. He offers Brody the chance to run for a seat in the House of Representatives soon to be vacated by the disgraced Richard Johnson. Brody accepts the offer. Jessica (Morena Baccarin) is resistant to the idea, fearing the media scrutiny and disruption to their lives. She also reveals that she knows Brody and Carrie had an affair, much to Brody's surprise.

Carrie (Claire Danes) and Saul have been digging for dirt on Mansour Al-Zahrani (Ramsey Faragallah), the Saudi diplomat who was found to be conferring with Tom Walker (Chris Chalk) at the mosque. He is heavily in debt, yet is making large deposits to a Swiss bank. He is also leading a closeted gay lifestyle and they have photographs to prove it. Carrie and Saul corner Al-Zahrani at the bank he frequents, and stage an interrogation. Carrie presents the photos and threatens to out him to his wives, his children and his ambassador. Al-Zahrani calls her bluff, saying to go ahead and expose him, and that his wives already know he is gay. He starts to leave, but Carrie tries a new approach. She threatens to have Al-Zahrani's daughter, a National Merit Scholar attending Yale, deported to Saudi Arabia. Al-Zahrani finally agrees to co-operate, posting a signal at his house which indicates to Walker that they are to meet at noon in Farragut Square the next day.

Brody tracks down Mike (Diego Klattenhoff) and tries to make amends after their falling out. Brody apologizes and forgives Mike for his relationship with Jessica. He then asks Mike to appeal to Jessica to support his run for Congress. Brody also calls Carrie, wanting to discuss something personal. They agree to meet at Carrie's. She is led to believe there will be possible reconciliation and is heartbroken when Brody merely tells her he is running for Congress and wants to confirm that nobody knows about the affair they had.

Al-Zahrani arrives for the meet at Farragut Square, where various agents are undercover and waiting to seize Walker when he arrives. Carrie is there coordinating the operation. A black man who looks like Walker arrives, carrying a briefcase, but none of the agents can confirm it is him. Carrie observes that the man is carrying a briefcase in his left hand and has a watch on his right wrist, but that Walker is known to be right-handed. As the man approaches Al-Zahrani, Carrie attempts to evacuate the area. Walker is watching through a window nearby and, with his cell phone, remotely detonates a bomb that is in the briefcase. The bomb explodes, killing Al-Zahrani, the Walker look-alike and three bystanders, while grievously injuring many others. Carrie is left with severe concussion.

Jessica tells Brody that, after discussing it with the children, they all fully support his run for Congress.

Saul visits Carrie in the hospital. He tells her that the man who delivered the briefcase was a homeless man hired by Walker. Saul concludes that Walker was tipped off and that there must be a mole placed somewhere in the government. The duo watch Brody on television officially announcing his candidacy in the special election.

== Production ==
The episode was written by the consulting producer, Henry Bromell, his second writing credit for the series. It was directed by Guy Ferland, his first directing credit for the series. The featured songs are "All Blues" and "My Funny Valentine", both by Miles Davis.

The turning of Al-Zahrani pays homage to the turning of Grigoriev in Smiley's People by John le Carré.

== Reception ==
=== Ratings ===
The original broadcast had 1.22 million viewers, a decrease of 130,000 from the previous week.

=== Reviews ===
The A.V. Club's Emily VanDerWerff gave a "B+" grade, citing some logistical problems with the storyline but recognizing the episode's pivotal scenes as very well executed. Dan Forcella of TV Fanatic rated it a 4.5/5, noting that "Representative Brody" "did what Homeland continues to do on a weekly basis: deliver brilliant scene after brilliant scene".
