= Achilles Heel (Homeland) =

- Homeland episode
- Episode no.: Season 1 Episode 8
- Directed by: Tucker Gates
- Written by: Chip Johannessen
- Production code: 1WAH07
- Original air date: November 20, 2011
- Running time: 50 minutes

Guest appearances
- Chris Chalk as Tom Walker; Afton Williamson as Helen Walker; Jaden Harmon as Lucas Walker; Sarita Choudhury as Mira Berenson; Hrach Titizian as Danny Galvez; Linda Purl as Elizabeth Gaines; Billy Smith as Special Agent Hall; Ramsey Faragallah as Mansour Al-Zahrani

Episode chronology
← Previous "The Weekend"	Next → "Crossfire"
- Homeland season 1

"Achilles Heel" is the eighth episode of the first season of the psychological thriller television series Homeland. It originally aired on Showtime on November 20, 2011.

As Carrie and Saul reel from the news that Walker is alive, the intelligence community clashes on the best way to capture him; Brody learns a shocking truth about his captivity.

== Plot ==
Tom Walker (Chris Chalk) is in Washington, D.C., homeless, begging for money on the street. Mansour Al-Zahrani (Ramsey Faragallah), a Saudi diplomat, passes him a key and a note written on a dollar bill.

Carrie (Claire Danes) and David (David Harewood) talk to Walker's family. Helen Walker (Afton Williamson) says that her son Lucas (Jaden Harmon) reported having seen his dad, but believing him to be dead, she did not believe it to be true. In another room, Saul (Mandy Patinkin) questions Brody (Damian Lewis), who still insists that Tom Walker was killed in Iraq.

When Brody returns home from Langley, he and Jessica (Morena Baccarin) have an emotional conversation concerning her relationship with Mike. She expresses regret for having moved on while he was gone, but tries to get him to understand how long she waited for him. He says he does not blame her.

Saul shows Carrie his lead: Tom Walker calls his old home when his family is not home, just to hear their voices on the answering machine.

Elizabeth Gaines (Linda Purl), the Vice President's chief advisor, calls the Brody household during dinner, inviting Brody to "the party of the year". The family accepts her invitation.

At Saul's house, Mira Berenson (Sarita Choudhury) is packing to leave for India, and Saul is clearly upset about her plans. Carrie shows up and tells Saul that she personally contacted Brody after her surveillance operation was shut down. She insists that her personal contact with him is over. He is at first disapproving, saying it should never have happened, but then softens.

A task force is set to trace Tom Walker's next call to his family's house. Helen Walker answers his call, but he hangs up. The task force is not able to trace the call.

At Elizabeth Gaines' party, Gaines insinuates that Brody can be groomed to replace a politician who will soon resign because of a scandal.

Tom Walker calls again, and this time Helen Walker talks to him as the FBI traces the call. But she feels as if she has betrayed him, and she warns him to run. The FBI chases him into a mosque. They rush in and accidentally kill two men who were there for morning prayer, and Tom is able to escape. After this, David suggests that they inform the public about the news, dubbing him as a "terrorist". Meanwhile, Tom Walker uses his key and note to enter a storage facility, where a sniper rifle is waiting for him. The next morning, Carrie goes to Brody's house and tells him that Tom is still alive and that he is the turned prisoner of war.

Saul rushes home to see Mira. This is the morning that she is leaving for India. She is packing her things into a cab. Disappointed in the way things with Saul's career force him to be somewhat of an absentee husband, she says goodbye and the cab drives her away. Saul returns to his house, alone.

Mansour Al-Zahrani comes home at night to find that someone is waiting for him. He discovers Brody, who attacks him, furious, because Abu Nazir's people had told Brody that he had killed Tom Walker—his friend. He tells Al-Zahrani that he is done talking to Abu Nazir and to "tell him it's over."

== Production ==
The episode was written by co-executive producer Chip Johannessen, his second of four writing credits for the first season. It was directed by Tucker Gates, his first directing credit for the series.

== Reception ==
=== Ratings ===
The original broadcast had 1.2 million viewers, a decline of 220,000 from the previous episode.

=== Reviews ===
The A.V. Club's Emily VanDerWerff gave the episode an "A−", citing strong exploration of the characters, and also hailed the acting of Claire Danes on a weekly basis. Time's James Poniewozik expressed some apprehension about the plot twist in the final scene, but praised the acting and thematic elements, concluding "for now Homeland remains easily the strongest new show of the fall".
