= Semper I =

- Homeland episode
- Episode no.: Season 1 Episode 4
- Directed by: Jeffrey Nachmanoff
- Written by: Howard Gordon; Alex Gansa
- Production code: 1WAH03
- Original air date: October 23, 2011
- Running time: 50 minutes

Guest appearances
- Linda Purl as Elizabeth Gaines; Omid Abtahi as Raqim Faisel; Marin Ireland as Aileen Morgan; Hrach Titizian as Danny Galvez; David Marciano as Virgil; Maury Sterling as Max

Episode chronology
← Previous "Clean Skin"	Next → "Blind Spot"
- Homeland season 1

"Semper I" is the fourth episode of the first season of the psychological thriller television series Homeland. It originally aired on Showtime on October 23, 2011.

Carrie's surveillance warrant nears its expiration, making her more desperate. Brody increases his presence in the public eye, but finds more turmoil in his personal life.

== Plot ==
Brody (Damian Lewis), now promoted to gunnery sergeant, is in the midst of a string of public appearances which have made him an extremely popular figure. The Vice President's chief advisor Elizabeth Gaines (Linda Purl) talks to David Estes (David Harewood). She is interested in possibly recruiting Brody to run for public office but has questions about his mental stability. Brody gets a ride home from Mike (Diego Klattenhoff) after a speech to a graduating class of troops. The conversation turns to Brody and his family. Brody turns hostile and sarcastically thanks Mike for "being there" for his family and for his wife, strongly implying he knows about Mike's affair with Jessica. Brody later starts making veiled comments to Jessica (Morena Baccarin) implying the same.

Carrie (Claire Danes) has one day left before the FISA warrant expires, and she still has no solid evidence against Brody. She asks Saul (Mandy Patinkin) for an extension on the warrant, but Saul says to focus on the money trail instead and that the surveillance equipment in Brody's house must be removed the first chance she gets. The next day while the Brodys are at church, Carrie, Virgil (David Marciano), and Max (Maury Sterling) enter their house and remove all the cameras and microphones. Carrie takes the opportunity to search Brody's house, finding his Good Conduct Medal, and the garage, which had no cameras. She searches the entirety of the garage finding only the mat Brody uses for salat and the dish he uses for ritual purification before prayers. She thinks nothing of the two.

At Langley, Carrie delivers a briefing where she explains that nine hours after Lynne's death, Latif Bin Walid was seen at a laundromat which is also a known front for a Hawala location. Since then, they have security camera footage of 51 customers entering the laundromat, any of whom could be the recipient of the money transfer via the sold necklace. Their job is to investigate those 51 people. Raqim Faisel (Omid Abtahi), the man who bought the house near the airport along with Aileen Morgan (Marin Ireland), is on the list. Carrie eventually turns her attention to Raqim when it is learned that he made three recent trips to Pakistan. Carrie, along with analyst Danny Galvez (Hrach Titizian), start looking into his past and agree to surveil him the next day.

Carrie and Danny follow Raqim as he heads home from work. Aileen is home and receives a call from an unknown source saying "tell him traffic is bad on the Beltway." Aileen immediately runs upstairs and posts an American flag in the window, which is a signal to Raqim to steer clear of the house. Raqim spots the flag and keeps driving. Carrie and Danny continue to follow him for a while, come up empty, and eventually take him off the list of suspects.

The Brodys are hosting a party at their house. Gunshots are heard in the backyard. Everyone runs outside to find that Brody has killed a deer that had wandered into their yard, much to everyone's shock, especially his son Chris (Jackson Pace) who previously had taken a liking to the deer. Jessica finally unloads all her frustrations on Brody, taking him to task for his carelessly using a weapon and terrifying their children, along with his sexual dysfunctions and overall disturbing behavior since his return. She demands that he seek some kind of counseling.

The next night, Brody tells a relieved Jessica that he has decided to go to a veteran's support group meeting. Carrie, after losing her camera feeds, has resorted to staking out Brody's house; she follows him to the meeting. She walks into the meeting and pretends to bump into him. Brody recognizes her from the CIA debriefing. Carrie acts embarrassed and says she is not supposed to be there. She leaves, but Brody follows her outside. They form a connection over their mutual wartime experience in the Middle East, and lament how hard it is to talk about with people who were not there. The two have a brief, flirtatious conversation.

== Production ==
Series developers and executive producers Howard Gordon and Alex Gansa co-wrote the episode, and Jeffrey Nachmanoff directed.

== Reception ==
=== Ratings ===
The original broadcast had 1.1 million viewers which exceeded the rating of the pilot episode.

=== Reviews ===
Emily VanDerWerff of The A.V. Club gave the episode an A−, and praised the new story arcs and the fleshing out of some of the secondary characters. Scott Collura of IGN gave an 8.5/10 rating, and said regarding the final scene "Claire Danes and Damian Lewis are great together onscreen, and the show has been building to this moment since the pilot".
