= The Vest =

- Homeland episode
- Episode no.: Season 1 Episode 11
- Directed by: Clark Johnson
- Written by: Meredith Stiehm; Chip Johannessen
- Production code: 1WAH10
- Original air date: December 11, 2011
- Running time: 54 minutes

Guest appearances
- Amy Hargreaves as Maggie Mathison; James Rebhorn as Frank Mathison; Nasser Faris as The Tailor

Episode chronology
← Previous "Representative Brody"	Next → "Marine One"
- Homeland season 1

"The Vest" is the eleventh episode of the first season of the psychological thriller television series Homeland. It originally aired on Showtime on December 11, 2011.

Brody takes his family on a trip to Gettysburg. The aftermath of the explosion finds Carrie experiencing a manic episode.

== Plot ==
Saul (Mandy Patinkin) goes to the hospital to pick up Carrie (Claire Danes), who has been there for a week recuperating from her injuries. To his shock, he finds Carrie acting like a totally different person, talking a mile a minute, and ranting and raving about needing a green pen and theories about Abu Nazir. Saul and Maggie (Amy Hargreaves) take Carrie home. Maggie explains to Saul that Carrie has bipolar disorder, that the trauma from the explosion triggered a major manic episode in her, and that she will need to be supervised around the clock while her medication takes effect. Saul agrees to start staying overnight at Carrie's house. Meanwhile, Estes (David Harewood) meets with Vice President Walden (Jamey Sheridan) who is being kept in a safehouse after the bombing at Farragut Square. Walden is going to announce his candidacy for President soon and is frustrated that he is under protection and not out campaigning. He tells Estes he must track down Tom Walker and to "fire somebody...I don't care who."

Brody takes his family on a trip to Gettysburg, proposing it as a way to spend time together before he embarks on his campaign for Congress. Brody shows the family where the Battle of Gettysburg took place, and tells them stories of Civil War heroes. Later on, they go to a diner for lunch, and Brody excuses himself to get something at the drugstore. Brody instead heads to the back of a clothing store. Waiting there is a man who has tailored an explosive suicide vest for Brody. Brody tries on the vest while coldly asking whether the explosion will sever his head cleanly off his body.

Saul spends the night going through the sea of papers that Carrie had been working on all day. He groups everything by the color that Carrie assigned it and puts it all up on a wall, effectively producing a timeline of Abu Nazir's activity. Carrie and Saul analyze the timeline the next morning and focus on a period of inactivity from Abu Nazir which, unbeknownst to them, coincides with the death of Issa.

The Brody family returns home. Dana (Morgan Saylor) finds the package that contains the vest. Brody does not let her open it, claiming it is a gift for Jessica (Morena Baccarin). Dana shows her boyfriend some unsettling footage that she recorded of her father on her camera: a long period where he stood blankly in front of the battlefield, completely still.

Despite her father's (James Rebhorn) protests, Carrie calls Brody. She describes the period that Abu Nazir went silent, and asks Brody whether he has any insights into it, since he was there and had a personal connection with Nazir. Brody offers to come over and discuss it. Shortly after, Carrie answers her door, anticipating Brody's arrival, but she finds Estes at the door instead. Estes reveals that Brody talked to him, confessing to an affair with Carrie and claiming that Carrie was spying on him and continually harassing him. He finds Carrie to be acting bizarrely and discovers the "timeline" which is made up of highly classified materials that should not be in her home. Estes, already looking for a scapegoat, needs no more convincing—he fires Carrie.

== Production ==
Consulting producer Meredith Stiehm and co-executive producer Chip Johannessen co-wrote the episode, it was Stiehm's second writing credit for the series and Johannessen's third credit. It was directed by Clark Johnson, his second directing credit for the series.

Carrie Mathison's behavior during her manic episode was based in part on the personal experiences of writer Meredith Stiehm's sister, Jamie Stiehm, who is bipolar.

== Reception ==
=== Ratings ===
The original broadcast had 1.32 million viewers, an increase of 100,000 over the previous week.

=== Reviews ===
Critics were unanimous in their acclaim for the episode and for Claire Danes' performance. Andy Greenwald of Grantland.com called it "an intoxicatingly intense hour" and said of two of the principals "Claire Danes will and should receive accolades for her performance here" and "Mandy Patinkin is a marvel as her partner, a study in stillness as he tries to manage an unmanageable situation." IGN's Scott Collura gave "The Vest" a 9/10 score, declaring it to be "an excellent study of our two main characters" and that Danes would surely be winning awards for her performance. Emily VanDerWerff of The A.V. Club gave the episode an "A−" grade, and had high praise for both Danes' multi-faceted portrayal of Carrie's mania, and Damian Lewis' ability to play two almost irreconcilable halves of one character.

=== Accolades ===
Claire Danes won the Primetime Emmy Award for Outstanding Lead Actress in a Drama Series for her performance in this submitted episode at the 64th Primetime Emmy Awards.
