= The Good Soldier (Homeland) =

- Homeland episode
- Episode no.: Season 1 Episode 6
- Directed by: Brad Turner
- Written by: Henry Bromell
- Production code: 1WAH05
- Original air date: November 6, 2011
- Running time: 49 minutes

Guest appearances
- Omid Abtahi as Raqim Faisel; Marin Ireland as Aileen Morgan; James Urbaniak as Larry; Afton C. Williamson as Helen Walker; Marc Menchaca as Lauder Wakefield; Sherman Howard as Chip Shooter Haigh

Episode chronology
← Previous "Blind Spot"	Next → "The Weekend"
- Homeland season 1

"The Good Soldier" is the sixth episode of the first season of the psychological thriller television series Homeland. It originally aired on Showtime on November 6, 2011.

Carrie comes up with a way to get Brody to take a polygraph test. The tension between Brody and Mike finally comes to a head.

== Plot ==
Carrie (Claire Danes) arrives at Langley, seemingly rejuvenated. Everyone there is in disbelief that Afsal Hamid was able to kill himself. Carrie proposes that a polygraph test be administered to everyone who came into contact with Hamid. Carrie is excited because Brody (Damian Lewis) will be on the list; she is confident he will not be able to pass the polygraph. The testing process begins that day. Carrie is the first to take the polygraph. She passes every question, except for when she is asked if she has taken illegal drugs while employed by the CIA. Meanwhile, Saul (Mandy Patinkin) interviews a neighbor at the abandoned house that Raqim Faisel (Omid Abtahi) had bought, and he learns that Raqim was living with a woman there.

Raqim and Aileen (Marin Ireland), now on the run, arrive at a safehouse. They are about to enter but Aileen spots a booby trap on the door. Now under threat from al-Qaeda as well as the authorities, Raqim thinks they should turn themselves in, but Aileen refuses. At Langley, they have managed to identify Aileen Morgan as Raqim's girlfriend. They check into Aileen's background, and it is discovered she lived in Saudi Arabia for five years as a child. Saul is called on to take the polygraph. He is agitated from the beginning, and the polygraph indicates he is lying when he denies giving the razor blade to Hamid. He stands up and aborts the test, saying he is too busy and will finish it tomorrow.

A memorial service is held for Tom Walker. Brody delivers the eulogy while fighting back memories of beating Walker to death. Afterwards, Carrie finds Brody and tells him about the polygraph test he has to take; they schedule it for the following day. At the reception, Brody and Mike (Diego Klattenhoff) are chatting with some other Marines who attended the service. One of the Marines, Wakefield (Marc Menchaca), is drunk and turns belligerent. He angrily asks Brody why he came home alive, while Walker was killed. Brody says he was lucky. Wakefield then says all the men there wanted to have sex with Jessica while Brody was gone, but only one of them did. At that point, Mike attacks Wakefield. Brody then pulls Mike off Wakefield and, immediately sensing Mike is being defensive about his affair with Brody's wife, starts punching him without hesitation, saying, "you were my friend!" After bloodying Mike, Brody gets in his car and leaves.

That night, Carrie gets a call from Brody, who is at a bar and wants someone to talk to after his tumultuous day. Carrie arrives and they once again hit it off, having several rounds of drinks and enjoying getting to know each other. Both drunk, they walk out to the parking lot. Carrie admits to Brody that Hamid killed himself, and that the purpose of Brody's polygraph test will be to determine if he gave Hamid the razor blade. They start kissing, and end up having sex in Carrie's car.

Raqim and Aileen are staying in a motel. Their room is suddenly sprayed with machine gun fire. Raqim is killed, while Aileen escapes.

Saul takes the polygraph again and passes this time. He enters the observation room with Carrie, as Brody's test is next. Brody takes the test and easily passes on every question, including the one asking whether he gave Afsal Hamid the razor blade. Carrie is flustered, but has one more gambit - she tells the interviewer Larry (James Urbaniak) to ask Brody if he has ever been unfaithful to his wife. Brody looks right into the camera which Carrie is observing, and says "no." The polygraph reading does not budge. Saul wraps up the test, and Brody is excused. Carrie is now in the difficult position of knowing Brody is able to beat the polygraph, but unable to reveal to Saul how she knows this. Saul tells her to accept that Brody passed the polygraph and that it is time to forget him as a suspect.

Carrie goes outside. Brody drives up to her and tells her to get in his car. She does, and they drive off.

== Production ==
The episode was written by consulting producer Henry Bromell, his first of two writing credits for the first season. It was directed by Brad Turner, who was a primary director on 24, which Homeland developers Howard Gordon and Alex Gansa worked on.

The song being rapped by the Marines at the reception at Brody's House is "Rabbit Run" by Eminem.

== Reception ==
=== Ratings ===
The original broadcast had 1.33 million viewers, which marked a fourth consecutive week of growth in viewership.

=== Reviews ===
"The Good Soldier" received positive reviews from critics, who praised the development of the relationship between Carrie and Brody. Dan Forcella of TV Fanatic rated "The Good Soldier" a 4.5/5, citing Homeland's unpredictability as one of its strong suits. Alan Sepinwall of HitFix praised the chemistry between Danes and Lewis, saying "their scenes together the last few weeks have been tremendous".

=== Awards and nominations ===
Writer Henry Bromell was the co-winner of the 2011 Writers Guild of America Award for Best Screenplay – Episodic Drama, sharing the honor with Vince Gilligan.
