= The Weekend (Homeland) =

- Homeland episode
- Episode no.: Season 1 Episode 7
- Directed by: Michael Cuesta
- Written by: Meredith Stiehm
- Production code: 1WAH06
- Original air date: November 13, 2011
- Running time: 58 minutes

Guest appearances
- Marin Ireland as Aileen Morgan; Hrach Titizian as Danny Galvez; Amy Hargreaves as Maggie Mathison

Episode chronology
← Previous "The Good Soldier"	Next → "Achilles Heel"
- Homeland season 1

"The Weekend" is the seventh episode of the first season of the American psychological thriller television series Homeland. It originally aired on Showtime in the United States on November 13, 2011. The episode was written by Meredith Stiehm and directed by Michael Cuesta. It features series regulars Claire Danes, Damian Lewis, Morena Baccarin, David Harewood, Diego Klattenhoff, Jackson Pace, Morgan Saylor, and Mandy Patinkin.

Homeland centers around Carrie Mathison (Danes), a CIA agent who is convinced that Nicholas Brody (Lewis), a recently rescued American marine, has been turned by al-Qaeda. In "The Weekend", Carrie and Brody further complicate their relationship when they head to the countryside for the weekend. Jessica (Baccarin), Brody's wife, and Mike (Klattenhoff) face the fallout of the truth about their relationship. Meanwhile, Saul (Patinkin) catches Aileen on the run to Mexico.

"The Weekend" was first broadcast on November 13, 2011, and was watched by 1.42 million households in the United States. The episode was widely praised by critics.

== Plot ==
Aileen (Marin Ireland) flees to Mexico but is apprehended when she gets off the bus in Nuevo Laredo. Saul (Mandy Patinkin) is there and takes Aileen into custody. He brings her on a 30-hour car ride back to Virginia, hoping to use that time to convince her to divulge her role in the terrorist plot.

Brody (Damian Lewis) explains to Carrie (Claire Danes) that he needs to take a little time away from home. After stopping at a bar and having some drinks, Carrie suggests they go to a cabin out in the country that her family owns. They have sex shortly after arriving, and spend an enjoyable, romantic day at the cabin together. Both seem to be much more comfortable and at ease with each other than with anyone else.

Dana (Morgan Saylor) gets drunk with her friends at home and falls through the plate glass door. With Brody gone, Mike (Diego Klattenhoff) is called upon to help. He repairs the door while Jessica (Morena Baccarin) takes Dana to the hospital to get stitches. Mike and Jessica later express how much they miss each other, and how much of an upheaval it's been to have Brody back in their lives. Dana, however, would prefer that Mike stayed away, telling him "there's no place for my dad when you're here."

As they drive cross-country, Saul relates to Aileen his own experiences with a strict Jewish upbringing, and his marital difficulties, in an attempt to get Aileen to open up. As Aileen gets more comfortable with Saul, the topic of Raqim Faisel comes up. Aileen's desire to secure a proper Muslim burial for Raqim compels her to cooperate. She tells Saul everything she knows. Saul calls Estes (David Harewood) and tells him that Aileen's job was to buy the house near the airport and wait for a visitor. The visitor spent over an hour on the roof. Estes sends Galvez (Hrach Titizian) over to the house to inspect the roof. He discovers that there is a direct line of sight to a landing pad for Marine One, the President's helicopter, and that it is within an expert sniper's range.

Carrie and Brody cook dinner and have sex again. During the night, Brody has a nightmare. He wakes up yelling out "Issa! No!" Carrie hears this and tries to calm him down.

The next morning, Brody considers leaving Jessica for Carrie until he figures out that Carrie suspects him of being a terrorist. While discussing breakfast, Carrie slips up and mentions Brody's favorite brand of tea: Yorkshire Gold. Brody asks how she knows the tea he drinks and accuses her of spying on him. Carrie, knowing she has been caught, elects to turn the tables; she directly accuses Brody of being an agent of al-Qaeda. Brody reacts incredulously and challenges Carrie to ask him anything she wants. Carrie obliges and grills Brody about all his suspicious behavior since his return and the holes in his story. Brody maintains his innocence but makes some revelations. He admits his conversion to Islam and that he often prays in his garage. He says the "Issa" he mentioned in his dream was the name of a guard who treated him well. He did beat Walker to death, given the choice of killing Walker or being killed himself. He had indeed met Abu Nazir but concealed it from everyone because he had a genuine affection for the man. His suspicious finger movements are a reflexive motion coming from clutching prayer beads.

As Brody is leaving, Saul calls Carrie. He reports that Aileen has identified the "visitor" who was on the roof of her house. It was Tom Walker. Not only is he alive, but he is the prisoner of war who was turned. Upon hearing this, Carrie rushes out to Brody to apologize. She desperately tries to explain that despite her suspicions, the time they spent together "was real". Brody leaves, feeling betrayed, and Carrie is reduced to tears. Brody arrives home that night, and peeks in on his wife and kids as they lie in bed. He sits down in the living room and starts crying.

== Production ==
The episode was written by consulting producer Meredith Stiehm, her first of two writing credits for the first season. It was directed by executive producer Michael Cuesta, his third of the four episodes he directed for the first season.

== Reception ==
=== Reviews ===
"The Weekend" received overwhelming critical acclaim and was described by both the creators of the show and Damian Lewis as a "watershed" episode.

Salon.com's Matt Zoller Seitz thought the episode was "so deftly written, acted and directed — and so unconventionally yet elegantly structured — that it flirted with perfection". Emily VanDerWerff of The A.V. Club gave it an "A" grade, and said of the final conversation between Carrie and Brody "pitch-perfect, from beginning to end, and it was the sort of thing you’d expect to see in a season finale or penultimate episode, so fraught with tension and revelation was it". TIME's James Poniewozik praised the audacity of the writing, saying "in this stunner of an episode, Homeland blew up its status quo."

TV Guide, The Atlantic, GQ, and Salon.com all named "The Weekend" as one of the best episodes in all of television in 2011.

=== Ratings ===
"The Weekend" was first broadcast on November 13, 2011, on Showtime. It received a 0.6 Nielsen rating/share in the 18–49 demographic, and attracted 1.42 million American viewers, which was a fifth consecutive increase in viewership for Homeland week-to-week. It would end up as the second highest rated episode of the season.
