= Madeline Pratt =

- The Blacklist episode
- Episode no.: Season 1 Episode 14
- Directed by: Michael Zinberg
- Written by: Jim Campolongo
- Production code: 114
- Original air date: February 24, 2014

Guest appearances
- Jennifer Ehle as Madeline Pratt; Hisham Tawfiq as Dembe Zuma; Amir Arison as Aram Mojtabai; Rachel Brosnahan as Jolene Parker; Zach Grenier as Novak; Jason Butler Harner as Walter Gary Martin

Episode chronology
← Previous "The Cyprus Agency"	Next → "The Judge"
- The Blacklist season 1

"Madeline Pratt" is the fourteenth episode of the first season of the American crime drama The Blacklist. The episode premiered in the United States on NBC on February 24, 2014.

== Plot ==
Madeline Pratt (Jennifer Ehle), a former professional and personal interest of Red's, enlists Red's help in stealing a statue called the Effigy of Ashtart in the Syrian embassy. The statue secretly contains coordinates for Soviet nuclear bombs hidden in America, which has the interest of the Russian mob. Red enlists Elizabeth's aid in the operation, only for the pair to be double-crossed by Pratt. Faking their capture, Red succeeds in getting the location of the Effigy and the coordinates from Pratt. The statue is secured and one of Pratt's allies is arrested. Pratt is able to free herself and steals a precious painting from Red. Meanwhile, Cooper's investigation into Diane Fowler's disappearance is effectively stonewalled by Special Agent Walter Gary Martin of the D.C. Bureau, who says the orders "came from the top".

== Reception ==
=== Ratings ===
"Madeline Pratt" premiered on NBC on February 24, 2014 in the 10–11 p.m. time slot. The episode garnered a 3.1/9 Nielsen rating with 11.18 million viewers, making it the highest rated show in its time slot and the tenth most watched television show of the week.

=== Reviews ===
Jason Evans of The Wall Street Journal gave a mixed review of the episode: "As Blacklist episodes go this was unusual. For the first time I can recall, the subject of the episode, Madeline Pratt, end up just fine – neither captured nor dead". He went on to say: "Some of what happened involving the hunt for the effigy by the FBI and the Russians doesn't really make sense. I need to think about it a bit more, but this episode just felt "off" at times".

Jim McMahon of IGN gave the episode a 6.8/10, stating: "A decent hour of The Blacklist is highlighted by Lizzy's (criminal?) past". He went on to complement the "cool past" of Elizabeth Keen, and felt "tonight was the first time" he found her character to be "remotely interesting".
