= 20 Weeks =

- Directed by: Leena Pendharkar
- Written by: Leena Pendharkar
- Produced by: Jane Kelly Kosek; Leena Pendharkar
- Starring: Amir Arison; Anna Margaret Hollyman
- Cinematography: Daud Sani
- Edited by: David Hopper
- Music by: Kate Simko
- Production companies: Meritage Pictures; Spicy Mango Productions
- Distributed by: Uncork’d Entertainment
- Release date: June 19, 2017 (LA Film Festival)
- Running time: 90 minutes
- Country: United States
- Language: English

20 Weeks is a 2017 American romantic drama film written and directed by Leena Pendharkar and starring Amir Arison and Anna Margaret Hollyman.

== Plot summary ==
The film shows Maya and Ronan learning during a routine 20‑week scan that their baby may have serious health problems. It moves between their past and present as they learn about the diagnosis and consider whether to continue the pregnancy.

== Cast ==
- Anna Margaret Hollyman as Maya
- Amir Arison as Ronan
- Michelle Krusiec as Dr. Chen
- Sujata Day as Ruby
- Jocelin Donahue as Eileen

== Release ==
The film premiered at the LA Film Festival on June 19, 2017.

== Reception ==
The film has a 60% rating on Rotten Tomatoes based on five reviews.

Kimber Myers of the Los Angeles Times gave the film a positive review, describing it as "compelling if difficult viewing for anyone interested in seeing a variety of parental experiences on screen."

Alan Ng of Film Threat awarded the film four stars out of five and wrote, "20 Weeks is a series of real moments accentuated with authentic dialogue. Situations and setting feel spontaneous and not staged."

The Hollywood Reporter gave the film a negative review: "Attractive and capably acted but oddly airless, the drama is a downer without offering much reward for our time."
