= Clean Skin =

- Homeland episode
- Episode no.: Season 1 Episode 3
- Directed by: Dan Attias
- Written by: Chip Johannessen
- Production code: 1WAH02
- Original air date: October 16, 2011
- Running time: 49 minutes

Guest appearances
- Brianna Brown as Lynne Reed; Amir Arison as Prince Farid Bin Abbud; Alok Tewari as Latif Bin Walid; David Marciano as Virgil; Melissa Benoist as Stacy Moore; Lawrence O'Donnell as himself

Episode chronology
← Previous "Grace"	Next → "Semper I"
- Homeland season 1

"Clean Skin" is the third episode of the first season of the political thriller television series Homeland. It originally aired on Showtime on October 16, 2011.

Carrie's investigation into the Prince gets her closer to what Abu Nazir is planning. Brody tries to embrace his hero status in the media.

== Plot ==
Prince Farid (Amir Arison) leaves the room after having sex with Lynne (Brianna Brown). While he is gone, Lynne takes the opportunity to download the contents of his phone using the device Carrie gave her. The download finishes undetected, and the Prince returns. He then clasps a diamond necklace around Lynne's throat.

At the Brody household, a large TV crew is present, preparing for a televised interview with Brody (Damian Lewis) and his family. Dana (Morgan Saylor) later hangs out with her friends and discusses the surge of media attention. Unhappy with the media's dishonest portrayal of her family, she considers sabotaging the interview. Dana reveals more discontent in a car ride with her mother, Jessica (Morena Baccarin); she knows about the affair with Mike (Diego Klattenhoff) and resents her for it.

Brody conducts the first part of his TV interview. The host asks Brody about his experiences as a prisoner of war. Brody says his captors tried to make him lose his faith, told him his Marine brothers were not coming to get him, and that his wife was in the arms of another man. An event that he fails to mention is shown in a flashback, where Brody is being 'saved' from a beating by Abu Nazir (Navid Negahban), who comforts him and gives him food. The second part of the interview is with Brody and his whole family to discuss his re-integration with the family. The interview goes smoothly, possibly thanks to a talk Brody had with Dana beforehand, where he asked her to cut her mother some slack, as she and everyone in the family are going through a difficult time.

Carrie (Claire Danes) briefs a team at headquarters regarding the lead on Abu Nazir. She reports that Prince Farid was seen talking to Nazir, and that her asset has procured the Prince's phone data. She expects there to be evidence of a money transfer on the phone. Later, Carrie has another rendezvous with Lynne, who delivers the contents of the Prince's phone. Lynne says she has barely left the Prince's side for over a year, and expresses doubt that he could have terrorist connections. Carrie turns the phone data over to an analyst at the CIA, but they find nothing incriminating at all.

Later, in a night club with newly recruited girls, Lynne is instructed by the Prince's majordomo, Latif Bin Walid (Alok Tewari), to visit a new business partner of the Prince's and show him a good time. Lynne is rather suspicious as she usually gets such orders directly from the Prince. Slipping away to the restroom just before leaving the club, Lynne calls Carrie and apprises her of the situation. Carrie smells a potential lead and lies to Lynne again, assuring her that the CIA has people watching and protecting her. Carrie and Virgil (David Marciano) set off immediately, in an attempt to keep tabs on Lynne themselves. Lynne leaves the club but her "driver" shoots her dead, takes her diamond necklace, and leaves her body in the alley. Carrie and Virgil then arrive on the scene. They see that Lynne is dead and leave immediately at Virgil's insistence.

The Prince is interviewed by the police regarding Lynne's murder and seems genuinely devastated, further casting doubt on his involvement. Carrie is wracked with guilt after she promised Lynne protection that was not really there. Saul tries to get her mind back on the case. Carrie speculates that the true connection to Abu Nazir might not be the Prince, but somebody in his entourage. Saul reminds her of the missing diamond necklace, and how jewelry is often used to transfer funds quickly and as a means of financing terrorist operations.

Latif negotiates the sale of Lynne's necklace, eventually getting $400,000 for it. A young couple is then shown purchasing a new home. The realtor congratulates them on their new home, and comments on how unusual it is to have a couple so young pay for their home in full in cash. A plane flies overhead, and she assures them that they will soon get used to the sound. However, they seem quite pleased with the fact that the house is very close to the airport, claiming it is convenient.

== Production ==
Co-executive producer Chip Johannessen wrote the episode, his first of four writing credits for the first season. It was directed by Dan Attias.

== Reception ==
=== Ratings ===
The original broadcast had 1.08 million viewers, which was equal with the rating of the series premiere.

=== Reviews ===
Dan Forcella of TV Fanatic rated "Clean Skin" a 4.5/5, calling it "another gem of an episode". Scott Collura of IGN gave the episode an 8.5/10, and observed that Homeland doesn't shy away from darker storylines. Jesse Carp of Cinema Blend said it was a "very strong episode" and that "In only three episodes they have laid an amazing foundation of character and plot on which to continue to craft an engaging and thought provoking series".
