= Brianna Brown =

American actress and producer

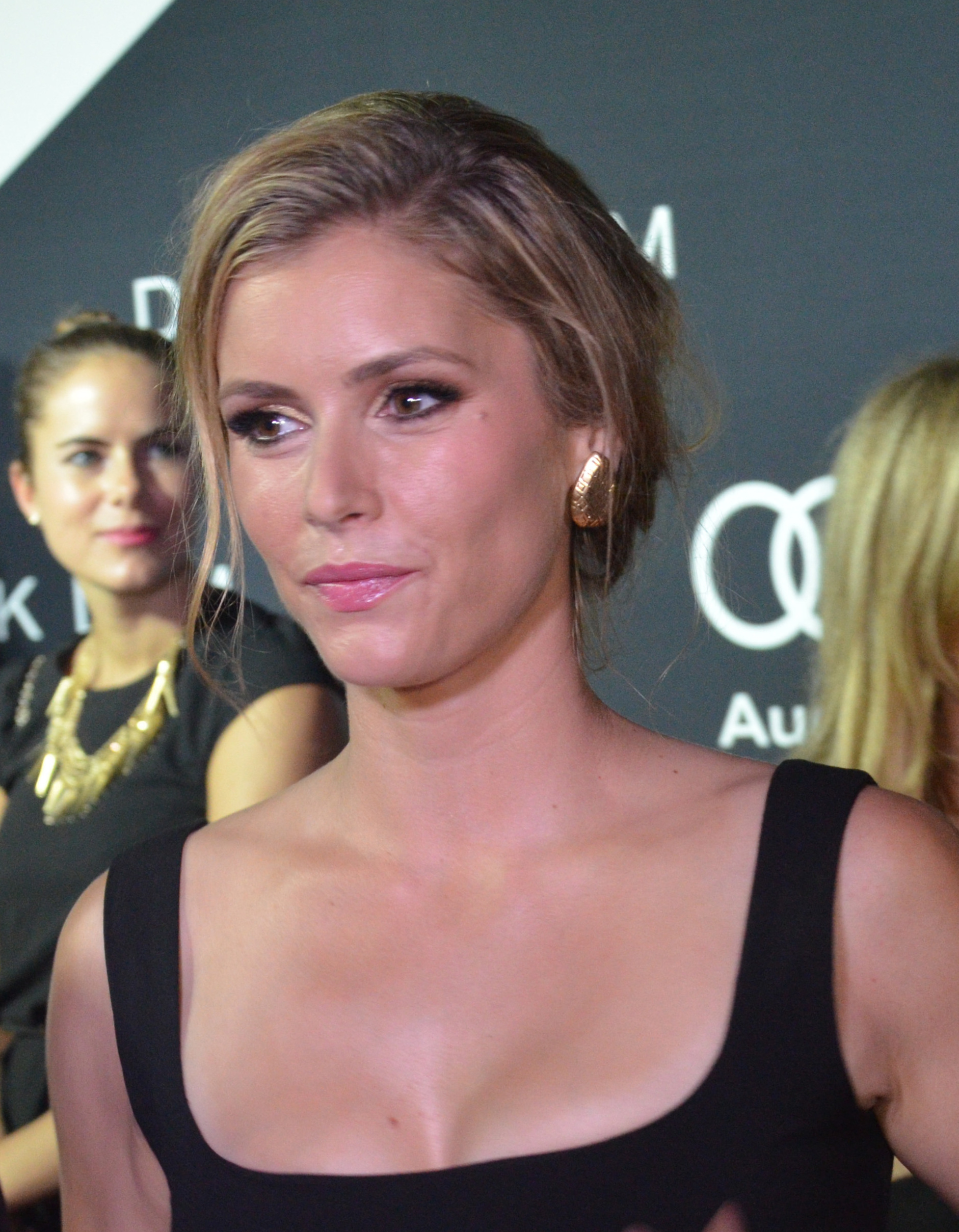
- Brown in 2012
- Born: Saint Paul, Minnesota, U.S.
- Occupation: Actress
- Years active: 1999–present
- Spouse: Richie Keen (m. 2017)
- Children: 1

Brianna Brown is an American actress and producer. She is known for her television roles as Lisa Niles in the ABC soap opera General Hospital, Taylor Stappord in the Lifetime series Devious Maids and as Claudia Blaisdel in The CW reboot series Dynasty.

== Life ==
Brown was born in Saint Paul, Minnesota and grew up in the Twin Cities suburb of Apple Valley. She briefly attended St. Olaf College before moving to Los Angeles when she was 19.

Brown married film director Richie Keen near Santa Barbara in May 2017. In March 2018, it was reported that the couple was expecting their first child; Brown gave birth to a son in July 2018.

== Career ==
Brown made her first on-screen appearance in 1999 in an episode of NBC series Freaks and Geeks, and in later years acted in many films and television series. On television, she guest starred in CSI: Crime Scene Investigation, Smallville, Entourage, Without a Trace, The Closer, Joey, and Criminal Minds. She has played the lead roles in the horror films Night of the Living Dead 3D (2006) and Timber Falls (2007). Brown also co-starred in horror film The Lost Tribe and the Judd Apatow comedies The 40-Year-Old Virgin and Knocked Up.

From 2010 to 2011, Brown portrayed Lisa Niles in ABC daytime soap opera General Hospital. Later in 2011, she played Lynne Reed in the Showtime thriller series Homeland. In 2012, Brown was cast in a series regular role in the first season of the prime time comedy-drama series Devious Maids. Her character was written out after season one, but returned for the series' third season. In 2014, Brown was cast as regular in ABC drama pilot The Whispers opposite Lily Rabe and Milo Ventimiglia. On June 11, 2014, it was announced that Brown had left The Whispers and that her role would be recast. She later went to appear on Revenge, The Mentalist, Graceland, and NCIS: New Orleans.

In 2017, Brown was cast as Claudia Blaisdel in The CW television series Dynasty, a reboot of the 1980s series of the same name.

== Filmography ==
=== Film ===
Year	Title	Role	Notes
2001	The Animal	Other Mob	as Brianna Lynn Brown
2003	Yuri & Me	Dee Dee	Short film
2003	Hollywood Homicide	Shawna	as Brianna Lynn Brown
2004	Spider-Man 2	Train Passenger	
2005	The 40-Year-Old Virgin	Bar Girl	as Brianna Lynn Brown
2005	Conversations with Other Women	Bride	
2005	Ex Post Facto	Lynn	Short film
2005	National Lampoon's Adam and Eve	Cindy	as Brianna Lynn Brown
2006	Night of the Living Dead 3D	Barb	
2006	Love's Abiding Joy	Melinda Klein	
2007	Knocked Up	Alison's Friend	as Brianna Lynn Brown
2007	No Destination	Aryl	Short film
2007	Timber Falls	Sheryl	
2010	The Lost Tribe	Alexis	
2010	The Encounter	Bretta Louie Van Seil	
2011	Retail Therapy	Brianna Hyatt	Short film
2013	Screwed	Jen	
2015	Kiss Me, Kill Me	Amanda	
2017	The Evil Within	Susan	Filmed in 2002
2017	Fist Fight	News Reporter	
2018	Hollywood Checkmate	Brianna Brown	Documentary film
2018	Elevate	Bretta Louie	

=== Television ===
Year	Title	Role	Notes
1999	Search for the Jewel of Polaris: Mysterious Museum	Kim	Television film
1999–2000	Freaks and Geeks	The Cheerleader / Perky Blonde	Episodes: Pilot, "Kim Kelly Is My Friend"
2001	Special Unit 2	Candy	Episode: "The Depths"; as Brianna Lynn Brown
2002	Off Centre	Customer	Episode: "The Gas Crisis"
2002	Robbery Homicide Division	Jules Azar	Episode: "In/Famous"
2002	CSI: Crime Scene Investigation	Jane Galloway	Episode: "Stalker"; as Brianna Lynn Brown
2003	Lost at Home	Lisa	Episodes: "The Story of Us", "Best Friends"; as Brianna Lynn Brown
2003	CSI: Miami	Amanda	Episode: "Big Brother"; as Brianna Lynn Brown
2004	Smallville	Abigail Fine	Episode: "Facade"; as Brianna Lynn Brown
2005	Joey	Elsa	Episode: "Joey and the Temptation"; as Brianna Lynn Brown
2005	Entourage	Jewelry Salesgirl	Episode: "My Maserati Does 185"; as Brianna Lynn Brown
2006	Monk	Joanne Raphelson	Episode: "Mr. Monk and the Astronaut"
2006	Shark	Carrie Reed	Episodes:"Pilot, "LAPD Blue"
2007	Dash 4 Cash	Noelle	Television film
2007	CSI: NY	Heidi Pesco	Episode: "The Ride In"; as Brianna Lynn Brown
2008	Without a Trace	Bobby Kruger	Episode: "Driven"
2009	The Closer	Lauren Clark	Episode: "Power of Attorney"
2009	Criminal Minds	Megan Kane	Episode: "Pleasure Is My Business"
2010–2011	General Hospital	Lisa Niles	Regular role
2011	Homeland	Lynne Reed	Episodes: "Grace", "Clean Skin"
2011	Body of Proof	Molly Anderson	Episode: "Love Bites"
2011	Adults Only	Kris	Web series
2012	Private Practice	Sam's Date	Episode: "The Standing Eight Count"
2012	CSI: Crime Scene Investigation	Paula Bingham	Episode: "Tressed to Kill"
2012	Awake	Kate	Episode: "Kate Is Enough"
2012	True Blood	Leda	3 episodes
2012	Drop Dead Diva	Hannah Baker	Episode: "Jane's Getting Married"
2012	Dating Rules from My Future Self	Noelle Williams	2 episodes
2012	Common Law	Carine Thompsen	Episode: "Performance Anxiety"
2013–2015	Devious Maids	Taylor Stappord	Main role (seasons 1 & 3); guest role (season 2)
2013	Revenge	Lacey	Episode: "Mercy"
2014	The Mentalist	Krystal Markham	Episode: "White Lines"
2014	Graceland	Kelly Badillo	4 episodes
2015	Castle	Eva Whitfield	Episode: "I, Witness"
2016	NCIS: New Orleans	Melody James	3 episodes
2017	Secrets in Suburbia	Gloria	Television film
2017	The Mick	Aimee	Episode: "The Hotel"
2015–2019	EastSiders	Hillary Whitfield	13 episodes
2020	The Last O.G.	Jessica	Episode: "In Da Club"
2021	Leverage: Redemption	Bronwyn Lark	Episode: "The Unwellness Job"
2017–2018, 2022	Dynasty	Claudia Blaisdel	Recurring role
2022	The Rookie	Abby	Season 5; Episode: "Crossfire"
2024	Outer Banks	Hollis Robinson	7 episodes
2024	NCIS	Melinda	Season 22; Episode: "Knight and Day"

== Awards and nominations ==
Year	Work	Award	Category	Result	Refs
2011	The Encounter	Long Island International Film Expo	Best Actress	Won	
2011	The Encounter	Toronto International Film Festival Award	Best Actress	Won	
2013	Adults Only	Indie Soap Award	Best Supporting Actress — Comedy	Nominated	
2016	EastSiders	Indie Series Award	Best Lead Actress — Drama	Nominated	
