= Jeffrey Nachmanoff =

American screenwriter and director (born 1967)

- Born: March 9, 1967 (age 58); New York City, U.S.

Jeffrey Nachmanoff (born March 9, 1967) is an American screenwriter and director.

== Filmography ==
Short film

Year	Title	Director	Writer
1993	The Big Gig	Yes	Yes

Feature film

Year	Title	Director	Writer
2001	Hollywood Palms	Yes	No
2004	The Day After Tomorrow	No	Yes
2008	Traitor	Yes	Yes
2018	Replicas	Yes	No

Television

Year	Title	Director	Producer	Writer	Notes
2010	Detroit 1-8-7	Yes	No	No	Episode "Pilot"
2011	Homeland	Yes	No	No	Episodes "Semper I" and "Crossfire"
2012	Chicago Fire	Yes	No	No	Episode "Pilot"
2013–2014	Hostages	Yes	Yes	Yes	Also developer; Directed episodes "Pilot" and "Endgame"
2014	Legends	No	Consulting	Story	Also developer; Wrote episode "Pilot"
2015	Allegiance	Yes	No	No	Episode "Tipping Point"
2017	The Brave	Yes	No	No	Episode "The Greater Good"
2019	The Passage	Yes	No	No	Episode "How You Gonna Outrun the End of the World?"
2019	Chicago P.D.	No	No	Yes	Episode "Fathers and Sons"
2020	Lovecraft Country	Yes	No	No	Episode "Rewind 1921"
2023	Echo 3	Yes	No	No	Episode "Scorched Earth"
2025	Daredevil: Born Again	Yes	No	No	Episodes "Sic Semper Systema" and "With Interest"

== Unproduced work ==
Nachmanoff previously contributed to the script for Prince of Persia: The Sands of Time earlier in its development history.

== Personal life ==
Nachmanoff's brother, Dave Nachmanoff, is a singer-songwriter and regularly supports Al Stewart. Jeffrey appears on his brother's album Threads of Time.
