= Gideon Raff =

Israeli film director

Gideon "Gidi" Raff
- גדעון "גידי" רף
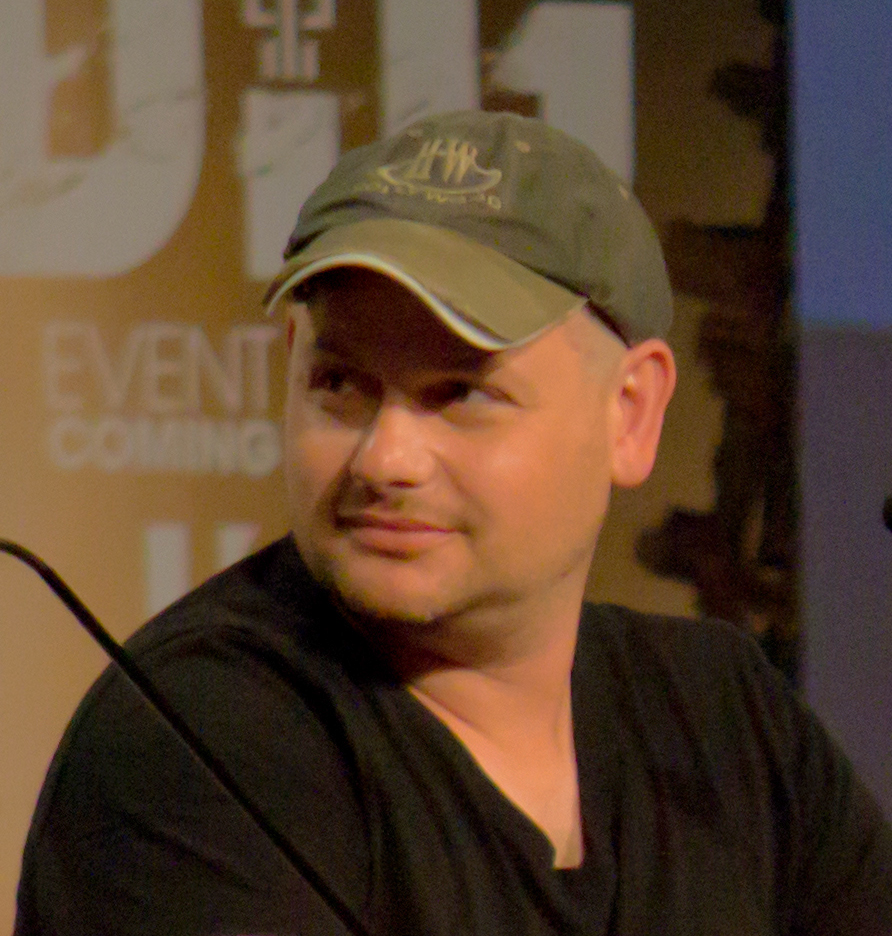
- Gideon Raff at the 2014 San Diego Comic-Con
- Born: Gideon Raff; 10 September 1972 (age 53); Jerusalem
- Occupations: Director, screenwriter, writer
- Partner: Udi Peleg
- Writing career
- Notable work: Prisoners of War
- Notable awards: Primetime Emmy for Outstanding Drama; 2012 Homeland; Primetime Emmy for Outstanding Writing for a Drama Series; 2012 Homeland: "Pilot" shared with Alex Gansa and Howard Gordon

Gideon "Gidi" Raff (Hebrew: גדעון "גידי" רף; born 10 September 1972) is an Israeli film and television director, screenwriter, and writer. He is best known for his creation of the Channel 2 thriller drama series Prisoners of War, from which he later co-developed the American version of the series, Homeland.

== Early life ==
Raff was born in Jerusalem, to a Jewish family. His father is Eitan Raff, who served as Accountant General in the Israeli Ministry of Finance, was Chairman of the Board of Bank Leumi and, as of August 2017, was under criminal investigation for having aided US customers in tax evasion.

From the ages of two to six he lived in Washington, D.C., where his father was Economic Adviser to the Israeli Embassy.

After serving three years as a paratrooper in the Israel Defense Forces, he completed a degree in film at Tel Aviv University.

Raff then worked in IT. For a year or so, during the dot-com bubble, he was responsible for content at a startup company, and wrote a weekly column in Israeli newspaper Ma'ariv about his experiences. The columns were collected into a book titled Diary of a Start-Upper on the Way to the Hit (Exit) (Keter, 2001).

== Film and television career ==
Raff moved to Los Angeles and, in 2003, completed a graduate degree in directing at the American Film Institute. His graduation short film The Babysitter premiered at the Tribeca Film Festival in New York, following which director Doug Liman hired him as director's assistant on the 2005 film Mr. & Mrs. Smith, which starred Brad Pitt and Angelina Jolie.

Raff made his feature-length directorial debut in 2007 with The Killing Floor, a psychological thriller (which he also co-wrote and co-produced; the film's executive producers were Doug Liman and Avi Arad).

His second feature was released in 2008—a horror film, Train, starring Thora Birch.

2009 saw Raff return home for the production of Prisoners of War, an Israeli television drama series which he created, wrote and directed. Filming began in August 2009, and the show was broadcast in Israel in the spring of 2010. The series became the country's highest-rated drama of all time, and went on to win several Israeli television awards.

Even before filming of Prisoners of War began, the rights to develop an American version of the series had been sold to 20th Century Fox Television based on the strength of the script alone. This resulted in the acclaimed series Homeland, developed by former 24 producers and writers Howard Gordon and Alex Gansa in cooperation with Raff, and broadcast on cable channel Showtime in the autumn of 2011. In addition to translating the original scripts from Hebrew into English, Raff acted as an executive producer on the US show and co-wrote the pilot episode.

Raff returned to Israel in 2011 for production of the second season of Prisoners of War (which he again wrote and directed). The new season did not begin airing in Israel until October 2012—just two weeks after the second season of Homeland started airing in the US. Raff has confirmed that he intends to write a third season.

In December 2012 it was reported that Raff had sold the pilot for a new TV drama series, Tyrant, to cable TV channel FX after FX won a bidding war against Showtime and HBO (FX had previously passed on Homeland). The drama revolves around an unassuming American family caught up in the turbulence of the Middle East. Raff created the concept and wrote the pilot script. The show was produced by Raff, Howard Gordon and Craig Wright. Film director Ang Lee had agreed to direct the pilot (in his first foray into television) but withdrew from the project in May 2013 for personal reasons and was replaced by David Yates. The pilot was filmed in the summer of 2013 in Morocco. FX ordered 10 episodes of Tyrant, which premiered in the summer of 2014.

In November 2013 Raff and Heroes creator Tim Kring finalised a six-episode deal with USA Network for Dig, an archaeological thriller about an American FBI agent stationed in Jerusalem. The TV series premiered in late 2014. S.J. Clarkson directed the pilot episode.

In 2017, it was announced that Raff would write and direct The Spy about the life of Eli Cohen. The series aired on Canal+ in France and streamed on Netflix internationally.

His Netflix film The Red Sea Diving Resort was released on 31 July 2019.

== Awards ==
At the 2010 Israeli Academy Awards for Television, Raff won the award for Best Director (Drama) for Prisoners of War, which won a total of four awards including Best Dramatic Series.

At the 64th Primetime Emmy Awards in 2012, Raff (together with co-writers Howard Gordon and Alex Gansa) won the award for Outstanding Writing for a Drama Series, for the pilot episode of Homeland. The series won a total of six awards, including Outstanding Drama Series.

Raff, Gordon and Gansa also won the 2012 Edgar Award from Mystery Writers of America for Best Episode in a TV Series.

The series won the award for Best Television Series - Drama at both the 2012 and 2013 Golden Globe Awards. It also won the 2012 Writers Guild of America Award for Best New Television Series.

== Personal life ==
Raff is openly gay. He lives with his partner Udi Peleg in Los Angeles. In 2012, as part of a PETA campaign, Raff wrote to both U.S. Secretary of Defense Leon Panetta and the United Kingdom Ministry of Defence to protest against use of live animals to train army doctors in battlefield surgery and proposed, with his partner, to become human guinea pigs, to facilitate the learning of surgeons.
