= Pilot (Homeland) =

- Homeland episode
- Episode no.: Season 1 Episode 1
- Directed by: Michael Cuesta
- Written by: Howard Gordon; Alex Gansa; Gideon Raff
- Production code: 1WAH79
- Original air date: October 2, 2011
- Running time: 55 minutes

Guest appearances
- Jamey Sheridan as William Walden; Navid Negahban as Abu Nazir; David Marciano as Virgil; Maury Sterling as Max; Nestor Serrano as Tony Trujillo; Afton Williamson as Helen Walker; Josh Segarra as Josh

Episode chronology
← Previous —	Next → "Grace"
- Homeland season 1

"Pilot" is the first episode of the psychological thriller television series Homeland, launching the beginning of its first season. It originally aired on Showtime on October 2, 2011.

The episode focuses on the return home of Marine Sergeant Nicholas Brody (Damian Lewis), rescued after eight years as a prisoner-of-war in Afghanistan. While Brody is celebrated as a hero, CIA officer Carrie Mathison (Claire Danes) believes Brody to actually be acting as a sleeper agent for al-Qaeda.

The pilot was universally acclaimed by critics and was the highest-rated drama premiere on Showtime since 2003.

== Plot ==
In flashback, Carrie Mathison (Claire Danes) is shown in Iraq, where she is working as a CIA case officer. She bribes her way into a prison, where one of her informants is being held - a bomb maker who is soon to be executed. As Carrie is spotted and dragged away by guards, the informant whispers something into her ear.

Back in present day, Carrie arrives late to a meeting at the CIA Counterterrorism Center, where she was reassigned following the Iraqi prison incident. Director of Counterterrorism David Estes (David Harewood) announces that Marine Sergeant Nicholas Brody (Damian Lewis), missing and presumed dead for eight years, has been rescued during a raid on an al-Qaeda compound. Carrie later confides in her co-worker and mentor, Saul Berenson (Mandy Patinkin), that what she was told by her informant in Iraq was that "An American prisoner of war has been turned." She concludes that the POW in question must be Brody. Saul flatly rejects the possibility of the CIA conducting any investigation into Brody, who is now a beloved war hero.

Jessica Brody (Morena Baccarin), Nicholas' wife, is shown having sex with Mike Faber (Diego Klattenhoff). Mike is later revealed to be Nick's best friend when he was captured, and a fellow Marine. Jessica is shocked to receive a phone call from Brody himself announcing his return, and she heads to the airport with their children, 16-year-old Dana (Morgan Saylor) and 12-year-old Chris (Jackson Pace), to greet him. While Brody is on his way home, Carrie is preparing to conduct her own unauthorized (and illegal) surveillance operation. She enlists her friend Virgil, an independent contractor, to install hidden cameras and microphones throughout Brody's house, which Carrie can monitor from home. They successfully complete the installation before Brody gets home. Carrie begins watching Brody's every move.

The next day, Brody is the subject of a CIA debriefing, where Carrie, David, and various other CIA personnel are present. Brody is questioned by everyone regarding his experiences as an al-Qaeda prisoner. Carrie asks Brody if he ever had any contact with Abu Nazir, the leader of al-Qaeda. He says no, but he is lying, as a memory of Brody's is shown of himself with Abu Nazir. Carrie is skeptical and asks again repeatedly before David puts a stop to it.

Later on, Brody goes to meet someone in the park. Believing that he may be meeting an al-Qaeda contact, Carrie, Virgil, and Max (Virgil's brother) follow him. But instead he meets up with Helen Walker (Afton Williamson), the wife of Tom Walker, a Marine who was captured together with Brody. Walker has also been missing for eight years, and Brody tells Helen that her husband was beaten to death while in captivity. Helen asks Brody if he was present while Tom was killed, and he says no, but again he is shown to be lying as Brody's memory of the beating is shown while he is clearly in the room. Carrie goes back home, where she meets a furious Saul already in her house. He has discovered her illegal surveillance setup and tells Carrie she will be reporting to the Inspector General and to "get a lawyer, you're going to need one". Carrie, in desperation, makes a pass at Saul, who leaves in disgust. Carrie is despondent and seemingly on the verge of a breakdown, but she eventually gets herself together enough to go to a bar, looking for a one-night stand. While chatting up a man at the bar, she studies musicians playing live at the bar, along with news footage on the TV of Brody's return, and suddenly has a revelation. She rushes over to Saul's house and shows him various news clips of Brody that day. She notes that every time Brody was on camera, he was tapping out a distinct sequence with his fingers. Carrie suggests that it looks like a coded message, possibly intended for a handler or sleeper cell. Saul agrees that it is something that needs to be investigated further.

In the final scene, Brody is jogging through Washington, D.C. As he jogs, more of his memories about Tom Walker's beating are being revealed, eventually concluding that, under command from Abu Nazir, it was actually Brody himself who beat Walker to death. Brody pauses from his jog to gaze at the Capitol Building.

== Production ==
The episode was co-written by executive producers Alex Gansa, Gideon Raff, and Howard Gordon, while executive producer Michael Cuesta directed.

== Reception ==
=== Ratings ===
The original broadcast of the pilot episode on October 2, 2011 at 10:00 pm received 1.08 million viewers, becoming Showtime's highest-rated drama premiere in eight years (since Dead Like Me which also starred Patinkin, with 1.11 million in 2003). The episode received a total of 2.78 million viewers with additional broadcasts, on demand, and online viewings.

=== Reviews ===
The pilot episode received universal acclaim, scoring a Metacritic rating of 91/100 from 28 reviews, with all 28 critics giving positive reviews. Hank Stuever of The Washington Post gave the pilot episode an A-, saying "What makes Homeland rise above other post-9/11 dramas is Danes' stellar performance as Carrie—easily this season's strongest female character" and that "The latter half of the first episode is exhilarating. I'm hooked." Matthew Gilbert of The Boston Globe said it was his favorite drama pilot of the season, giving it an A. Entertainment Weekly's Ken Tucker gave it an A-, stating "It's the fall season's most intriguing, tense puzzler." IGN TV gave it a positive review, saying that it was an "ace thriller" that also managed to have something to say about the war on terror.

=== Awards and nominations ===
Michael Cuesta received a nomination for the Directors Guild of America Award for Outstanding Directing – Drama Series, losing to Patty Jenkins for the pilot of The Killing.

The episode received Outstanding Directing for a Drama Series and Outstanding Writing for a Drama Series nominations at the 2012 Primetime Emmy Awards; Alex Gansa, Howard Gordon, and Gideon Raff won for Outstanding Writing for a Drama Series.

Jordan Goldman and David Latham won the Emmy Award for Outstanding Single-Camera Picture Editing for a Drama Series for their editing of "Pilot".

This episode won the 2012 Edgar Award for Best Television Episode Teleplay.
