= Blind Spot (Homeland) =

- Homeland episode
- Episode no.: Season 1 Episode 5
- Directed by: Clark Johnson
- Written by: Alexander Cary
- Production code: 1WAH04
- Original air date: October 30, 2011
- Running time: 56 minutes

Guest appearances
- James Rebhorn as Frank Mathison; Waleed Zuaiter as Afsal Hamid; Sarita Choudhury as Mira Berenson; Amy Hargreaves as Maggie Mathison; Hrach Titizian as Danny Galvez

Episode chronology
← Previous "Semper I"	Next → "The Good Soldier"
- Homeland season 1

"Blind Spot" is the fifth episode of the first season of the psychological thriller television series Homeland. It originally aired on Showtime on October 30, 2011.

The lone survivor of the al-Qaeda group that held Brody for eight years is captured. Saul and Carrie are to interrogate him, with Brody's help.

== Plot ==
Carrie (Claire Danes) visits her father, Frank (James Rebhorn), with the intent of pilfering some of his pills (he also has bipolar disorder). She manages to get some, but her visit is cut short when she gets a call telling her that the CIA has Afsal Hamid (Waleed Zuaiter) in custody, who was the lone survivor of the raid where Brody (Damian Lewis) was rescued in Iraq. Meanwhile, Saul (Mandy Patinkin) is at the airport, picking up his wife Mira (Sarita Choudhury) as she returns from India. Saul similarly gets a call about the captured terrorist and has to leave immediately, not even able to take Mira home.

Carrie and Saul arrive for an interrogation of Hamid. Sgt. Brody has also been summoned. Brody recognizes Hamid as his guard when he was in captivity. Flashbacks are shown of Hamid severely beating Brody and then urinating on him. Saul conducts the interrogation alone in the room with Hamid, while Brody and Carrie watch on camera and are able to talk to Saul via an earpiece. As the interrogation progresses, Brody feeds Saul details of his captivity, so that Saul appears all-knowing. Saul then offers to protect Hamid's family from Abu Nazir, if he is willing to talk. Hamid is then left in the interrogation room with the lights blinking, the air conditioning on full, and intermittent blasts of loud metal music are played. After many hours of this treatment, Hamid is seemingly ready to cooperate. He says he does not know much, but gives up an e-mail address to which he once passed along a message. The address is eventually traced back to the university where the previously investigated Raqim Faisel is working. A short time later, Raqim's home address is ascertained.

Brody meets with Estes (David Harewood) and makes a plea to have a face-to-face with Hamid. He argues that he has earned the right to confront his torturer, and that he needs to put that chapter of his life behind him. Estes knows such a thing should not be permitted, but ever the careerist, he is persuaded. With guards present in the room, Brody sits across a table from Hamid who is having a meal. After some taunting by Brody, Hamid spits in his face. Brody grabs Hamid out of his chair and wrestles him to the floor. The altercation is quickly broken up. Brody goes home to find that he missed Chris' (Jackson Pace) karate match, but Mike (Diego Klattenhoff) was able to give Chris a ride. After a tense confrontation with Mike, Brody later goes into Chris' room to find him praying. Chris says that for eight years, he and the family prayed for Brody to still be alive. Now, they pray that he is going to be okay.

Saul calls Carrie to inform her that Hamid is dead. He had somehow obtained a fragment of a razor blade and slashed his own wrist. Carrie, along with a team of agents, raid Raqim and Aileen's house but it is now empty. Carrie initially suspects a tip-off from within the CIA, especially with Hamid also mysteriously ending up dead.

Saul is home with Mira, who is at the end of her rope. She says she is tired of her life revolving around Saul and his all-consuming work. As this conversation is going on, Carrie shows up. She has learned of Brody's meeting with Hamid and has a tape of the camera footage with her. She is furious that Brody was allowed to have contact with Hamid, and points out that in the melee, Brody pulled Hamid into the blind spot of the camera, giving him ample opportunity to pass Hamid the blade. Saul is also angry that Brody was permitted to meet with Hamid, but refuses to take Carrie's suspicions up the chain of command, as there is still no hard evidence. Carrie says she will take it up with Estes, whether Saul approves or not. Saul counters that if she does so, she will be fired. Carrie storms out after a nasty argument.

Carrie goes to Langley and cleans out her office. She then shows up at her sister Maggie's (Amy Hargreaves) house, now an emotional wreck. In tears, she tells Maggie "I think I just quit my job." She complains about now having nobody's support, not even Saul's. The episode ends with Carrie unable to sleep and contemplating her future.

== Production ==
Co-executive producer Alexander Cary wrote the episode, his second of three writing credits for the first season. It was directed by Clark Johnson, his first of the two episodes he directed for the first season.

== Reception ==
=== Ratings ===
The original broadcast had 1.28 million viewers, which was an increase of 180,000 viewers over the previous episode.

=== Reviews ===
Emily VanDerWerff of The A.V. Club gave "Blind Spot" a grade of A, and declared "Homeland’s not just the best new show of the season; it’s the best show currently airing on TV". Jesse Carp of Cinema Blend thought the interrogation scene was "one of the most memorable in an already unforgettable series".
