= Amir Arison =

American actor

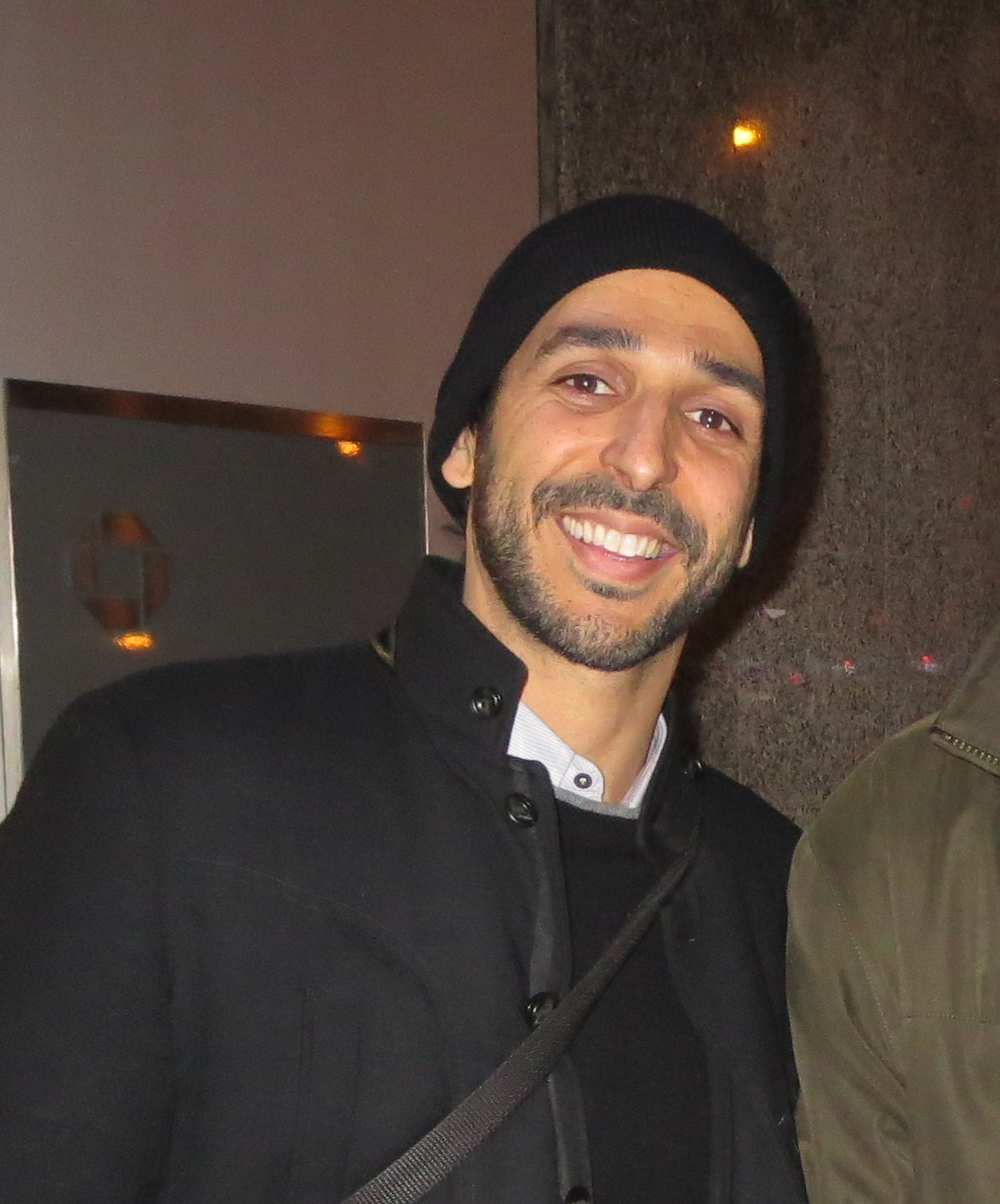
- Amir Arison
- Born: March 24, 1978 (age 48); St. Louis, Missouri, U.S.
- Education: Columbia University (BA)
- Occupations: Actor; director; producer
- Years active: 2003–present

Amir Arison (born March 24, 1978) is an American actor, best known for his work as FBI tech expert Aram Mojtabai on NBC’s The Blacklist for ten seasons.

== Early life and education ==
Arison's father, Ron Arison, is a surgeon, and his mother, Zipora Kittman, is a psychiatrist. He has one older sibling, Maya. Arison grew up in Fort Lauderdale from the age of five, where he attended Pine Crest School. He received the school's Drama Club Award in the 6th grade, as well as the Founder's Council Fine Arts Award in Acting his senior year. Amir performed with the Fort Lauderdale-based professional improv group ComedySportz throughout his junior and senior years. He received his SAG card, debuting in a Sonic Drive-In commercial when he was 16. He attended Columbia University, where he earned a BA in English.

== Career ==
Amir Arison is best known for his role as Aram Mojtabai for ten seasons on The Blacklist from 2013 to 2023. Arison produced and directed the 2016 short film Fortress, written by Anna Ziegler, as well as Tati's Fashion Show for Angelight Films. In 2018, he received the MIFF's Mendez Award for entertainment industry professionals who give back. He was a recipient of the 2022 NY SJFF Pomegranate Award for Career Achievement in Acting.

Arison received the 2023 Theater World Award for outstanding Broadway debut for starring in The Kite Runner. He received a 2023 Emmy Award for Hosting NBC/Telemundo's ‘Clear the Shelters’ Campaign, helping to get 161,000 animals get adopted.

Arison has worked with Clear the Shelters, YoungArts, United Arts Partnership, NBC director's diversity showcase, Pace University, The Acting Collective, Broadway for All, The Watson Institute, Broadway Workshop, Hole-in-the-Wall-Gang-Camp, and Angelight Films.

== Filmography ==
Year	Title	Role	Notes
2003	Guiding Light	Armande	Episode: "2 December 2003"
2003	The Jury	Tariq Ahmed	Episode: "Lamentation on the Reservation"
2004	Law & Order	Adil Salim	Episode: "Paradigm"
2005	Law & Order: Criminal Intent	Lt. Sanjay	Episode: "Collective"
2005	Law & Order: Special Victims Unit	Dr. Ghupta	Episode: "Parts"
2006	Hope & Faith	Phil Hobart	Episode: "The Big Shanowski"
2007	The Visitor	Mr. Shah	
2007	Law & Order: Criminal Intent	Tarek 'Rick' Agiza	Episode: "Depths"
2008	As the World Turns	FBI Agent	4 episodes
2008	Fringe	Dr. Bruce Miller	Episode: "Safe"
2009	NCIS	Prince Sayif Ibn Alwaan	Episode: "Flesh and Blood"
2009	I Hate Valentines Day	Bob	--
2009–2011	Law & Order: Special Victims Unit	Dr. Manning	8 episodes
2010	Undercovers	Israeli Officer	Episode: "The Key to It All"
2010	In Security	—N/a	TBS TV pilot
2011	State of Georgia	Trent Pierce	2 episodes
2011	Homeland	Prince Farid Bin Abbud	Episodes: "Grace", "Clean Skin"
2011	Medium	Harold Clark	1 Episode "Labor Pains"
2011	American Horror Story: Murder House	Joe Escandarian	Episode: "Open House"
2012	Gossip Girl	Officer Weiner	Episode: "Father and the Bride"
2012	True Justice	Abdul Hassan	2 episodes
2012	The Mentalist	Ryan Kasmir	Episode: "If It Bleeds, It Leads"
2012	Vamps	Derek	--
2012–2013	Dallas	Varun Rasmussen	2 episodes
2012–2013	H+	Dr. Gurveer	11 episodes
2013	Marvin Marvin	Mr. Buttsniffer	Episode: "Burger on a Bun"
2013	Pair of Kings	King Kunu	Episode: "Long Live the Kings Part II"
2013	Major Crimes	David Ahmed	Episode: "Under the Influence"
2013	Zero Hour	Theo Riley	6 episodes
2013	See Dad Run	Pete	Episode: "See Dad Runl Halloween"
2013	Once Upon a Time in Wonderland	The Sultan	Episode: "Bad Blood"
2013–2023	The Blacklist	Aram Mojtabai	193 episodes
2014	A Merry Friggin' Christmas	Farhad	--
2014	Girls	Kevin Mimma	3 episodes
2015	Jane Wants a Boyfriend	Rob	--
2016	Before the Sun Explodes	Chip	--
2016	Fortress (Short Film)	Kalev	--
2017	20 Weeks	Ronan	--
2019	Billions	Farhad	Episode: "Chucky Rhoades's Greatest Game"
2019	Ramy	Abdul Malek	1 Episode: "Saving Mikaela"
2019	Bull	ADA Roy Wilson	Episode: "Labor Days"
2022	Her False Self	--	--
2022	The Dropout	Avie Tevanian	Episode: "Green Juice"
2025	The Beast in Me	Frank Breton	Episode: The Beast and Me
2025	Dope Thief	Mark Nader	Main role
2026	Power Trip	Guy	Short film
