= Nicholas Brody =

Fictional character on the American television/drama thriller Homeland

- Homeland character
- First appearance: "Pilot"
- Last appearance: "Redux"
- Created by: Alex Gansa; Howard Gordon
- Portrayed by: Damian Lewis

In-universe information
- Full name: Nicholas Brody
- Nicknames: Brody, Nick
- Occupation: War Hero; Double Agent; Fugitive Terrorist; CIA Assassin; Former: U.S. Congressman, Former: Gunnery Sergeant, USMC
- Spouse: Jessica Brody
- Children: Dana Brody (with Jessica Brody); Chris Brody (with Jessica Brody); Frannie Mathison (with Carrie Mathison)

Nicholas Brody, played by actor Damian Lewis, is a fictional character on the American television series Homeland on Showtime, created by Alex Gansa and Howard Gordon. Brody is a United States Marine Corps Sergeant who is held as a prisoner of war by al-Qaeda terrorists for eight years. Following his rescue and return home, Brody is hailed as a war hero and promoted to Gunnery Sergeant. However, a CIA officer, Carrie Mathison, suspects that Brody was turned by al-Qaeda, and tries to stop him from potentially committing a terrorist act. For his performance in the first season, Lewis won the Primetime Emmy Award for Outstanding Lead Actor in a Drama Series.

== Character biography ==
=== Background and personality ===
Born in the Mojave Desert while his father was stationed at the MCAGCC, Gunnery Sergeant Nicholas Brody was a United States Marine Corps Force Reconnaissance Scout Sniper deployed during the Iraq War. On May 19, 2003, Brody and a fellow Scout Sniper Thomas Walker (Chris Chalk) were captured near the Syrian border by forces loyal to Saddam Hussein. The two men were sold to al-Qaeda commander Abu Nazir (Navid Negahban) and held captive in Damascus for the next eight years. Brody's guards tortured him for much of his captivity, but Nazir treated him with kindness in order to gain his trust. Brody converted to Islam while in captivity. Under Nazir's direction, Brody severely beat Walker and believed he had killed him.

Nazir ended Brody's torture in 2008 and invited him into his home, asking him to teach his son Issa English. Brody soon grew to love the boy as his own son. In 2009, however, Issa was killed in a drone strike while attending school. Brody helped Nazir bury Issa and joined him in reciting an Islamic prayer over the child's grave. Shortly thereafter, Brody watched an interview with Vice President William Walden (Jamey Sheridan), who falsely claimed that no children were killed in the drone strike. Brody swore revenge on Walden and agreed to kill him in a suicide attack.

=== Season 1 ===
Brody is rescued by Delta Force troops during a raid on a terrorist compound in Afghanistan. He is flown back to the US, where he is reunited with his wife, Jessica (Morena Baccarin), and his children, Dana (Morgan Saylor) and Chris (Jackson Pace). He also meets Walden during a press conference at Andrews Air Force Base. During his debriefing, Brody finds himself interrogated by CIA officer Carrie Mathison (Claire Danes), who had been told by an informant that an American POW had been turned by al-Qaeda. However, the interrogation is stopped by Carrie's superior, Counterterrorism Center director David Estes (David Harewood). Even so, Carrie sets up a slipshod intelligence operation and bugs Brody's house.

As he settles back into civilian life, Brody struggles with posttraumatic stress disorder and has nightmares about his captivity in Damascus, all of which takes a toll on his family. The situation is worsened when he finds out that Jessica and Mike Faber (Diego Klattenhoff), his best friend and fellow Marine, had been in a relationship while he was in captivity. Brody initially shuns the spotlight, physically assaulting a reporter who enters his backyard. He also rebuffs a suggestion from Faber that he re-enlist in the Marine Corps and seek a promotion. However, Brody eventually changes his mind and addresses the press in full uniform outside of his house.

Carrie watches Brody's TV appearances and notices that he taps his fingers in a repeated pattern, believing that he is giving a coded message. This observation convinces her CIA mentor, Saul Berenson (Mandy Patinkin), to help her obtain a FISA warrant for Brody's home. Carrie continues surveilling Brody after the warrant expires and breaches CIA protocol by approaching him at a support group for veterans. They bond immediately over their shared experiences in the Middle East.

The only survivor of the al-Qaeda group that held Brody for eight years is captured. Carrie summons him to consult about the interrogation of Afsal Hamid, his torturer during captivity. Brody meets Estes and demands an opportunity to confront Hamid, face to face. And it is later discovered that Afsal killed himself in his cell using a razor blade. Carrie suspects that Brody slipped the blade onto Hamid during the fight ("Blind Spot" episode).

Carrie comes up with a way to get Brody to take a polygraph test. The two eventually embark on a relationship. Carrie and Brody further complicate their relationship when they head to the countryside for the weekend.

Brody considers leaving Jessica for Carrie until he figures out that Carrie suspects him of being a terrorist. After it is revealed that Walker is alive and was also turned, Brody angrily rejects Carrie and goes back to his family. He tells his Saudi contact, Monsour Al-Zahrani (Ramsey Faragallah), to tell Nazir that he will not go through with their planned attack – a suicide bombing at a State Department policy summit that he and Walden will be attending. However, Brody reconsiders and records a suicide video, intending for it to be released after his attack. The video is collected in a drop by Nazir's men.

Brody retrieves a bomb vest from one of Nazir's men and prepares to kill himself. As Walker opens fire on the summit, Brody and his targets are sent to a safe room inside the State Department. As Brody prepares to detonate the vest, however, he finds that it does not work. After he fixes it in a restroom, Dana calls and asks him to promise he will come home; unbeknownst to Brody, Carrie had shown up at his house and told Dana what he was about to do. Brody decides not to detonate the bomb and later kills Walker to reassure Nazir of his loyalty. He tells Nazir via phone that he plans to run for a seat in Congress, which will allow him to influence the U.S. military as a double agent. He then tells Carrie, who has been fired from the CIA, to leave him and his family alone.

=== Season 2 ===
Six months after the State Department attack, Brody has been elected to the House of Representatives, representing Virginia's 7th congressional district. Walden approaches Brody and offers to tap him as his running mate during his planned presidential campaign. Meanwhile, Brody meets Roya Hammad (Zuleikha Robinson), a journalist who gives an assignment from Nazir instructing him to retrieve a list of potential attack targets from a safe in Estes' office. Despite his initial reluctance, Brody procures the list. Roya tells him to help an al-Qaeda bomb maker get to a safe house, but Brody ends up killing the man when he tries to escape. The incident causes him to miss a speaking engagement that Jessica had arranged for him. When he returns home, she tells him that she has had enough of his lies and that she is no longer sure of their marriage.

When Dana admits at school that her father is a Muslim, an angered Jessica confronts Brody and throws his Quran to the floor. Later, Dana helps Brody bury the desecrated Quran. Meanwhile, Berenson finds Brody's suicide tape in Beirut and gives it to Estes. Carrie is reinstated, and an operation is set up to monitor Brody's actions. They meet in a hotel bar, where she intuits that he is on to her and arrests him. During the ensuing interrogation, new team leader Peter Quinn (Rupert Friend) stabs Brody in the hand. Carrie takes over, and convinces Brody to become a triple agent for the CIA. Brody uses this as an excuse for his strange behavior to Jessica.

Dana is involved in a fatal hit and run committed by Walden's son Finn (Timothée Chalamet), her new boyfriend. Brody takes Dana to the police department to report it. Carrie stops him, stating it will affect his cover. Angered, Dana runs away and goes to stay with Faber, who by now has discovered that Brody killed Walker. Carrie tells Faber to stop his investigation into Walker's death, which he reluctantly does. Under pressure, Brody meets Hammad and says he wants out of the plot. During a tryst at a hotel, Carrie convinces Brody to return to Nazir so they can prevent his next attack. During a rendezvous with Hammad the next morning, Brody is taken away in a helicopter. In a warehouse, he is confronted by Nazir and reaffirms his loyalty as part of his cover.

Brody makes good on his pledge to help stop Nazir's attack. Later, he receives a call from Nazir, who is holding Carrie hostage; he threatens to kill her unless Brody helps him kill Walden. Brody goes to Walden's office and texts Nazir the serial number of Walden's pacemaker so Nazir can remotely tamper with it. Brody then demands that Nazir let Carrie go, which he does. As Brody meets with Walden and tells him he cannot accept a place on the ticket, Nazir causes Walden's pacemaker to malfunction. Brody refuses to call an ambulance and taunts Walden as he dies. That night, after learning that Nazir has been killed, Brody leaves Jessica and reunites with Carrie.

Dana finds Brody's explosive vest and asks him if he had been planning to use it; he replies that he changed his mind. He goes to Walden's funeral with Carrie, who tells him that she has decided to leave the CIA and be with him. Just then, however, a bomb hidden in Brody's car detonates and kills 219 of the funeral's attendees, including Walden's family and many CIA agents and government officials. Brody realizes that Nazir had planned the attack in advance of his own death and reassures Carrie that he had nothing to do with it. As she smuggles him into Canada, al-Qaeda airs his suicide tape, and he is branded as the mastermind of the attack. At the border, Brody and Carrie tearfully part ways, with Carrie promising to clear his name.

=== Season 3 ===
In the aftermath of the Langley bombing, Brody becomes one of the world's most wanted fugitives. In Caracas, Venezuela, he is shot twice and nearly dies before he is found by a group of drug dealers. They take him to a drug house, where Dr. Graham (Erik Dellums), an underground surgeon, saves his life. When Brody recovers, he asks the head of the drug ring, El Niño (Manny Pérez), why he is protecting him; El Niño replies that he knows Carrie. Anxious to keep moving, Brody convinces El Niño's daughter, Esme (Martina García), to take him outside. He approaches an imam and asks to be given sanctuary in a mosque. Instead, the imam reports Brody to the police. El Niño and his men arrive and kill the incoming police force, as well as the imam and his wife. El Niño tells Brody that he will spend the rest of his life in the drug house. Despondent, Brody injects heroin into his arm.

Saul goes to Caracas and finds Brody in a heroin-induced stupor. Brody is taken back to the US and weaned off of the drugs with ibogaine. Berenson and Carrie offer Brody a chance to redeem himself by seeking political asylum in Iran and assassinating the head of the Islamic Revolutionary Guard Corps, General Danesh Akbari (Houshang Touzie), so that CIA asset Majid Javadi (Shaun Toub) can take his place. Brody refuses, saying he wants to die. Carrie takes Brody to a motel where Dana is working as a maid but does not let him see her; she says that he must first atone for what he has done by taking part in the operation. Brody undergoes 16 days of rigorous Special Operations training, until he is once again in peak physical condition. On the night he is set to ship off to Tehran, Brody asks Carrie to take him to see Dana. He tells Dana he is innocent, but she replies that she never wants to see him again. As he gets ready to depart, Brody pledges that he will survive the mission and return for Dana and Carrie.

A team of Special Ops soldiers drives Brody to the Iranian border, where they are stopped by Iraqi police; when one of the officers recognizes Brody, the soldiers are forced to open fire. Brody panics and tries to run, but team leader Azzizi (Donnie Keshawarz) calms him down. Moments later, they hit a land mine, severely injuring Azzizi and attracting enemy fire. From Langley, Saul calls off the mission, but Brody is determined to cross the border. Carrie tries to dissuade him, saying that he will die if he goes in alone; Brody replies that she will have to think of a way to get him out safely. He identifies himself to the Iranian border guards and asks for asylum as planned, and the guards take him and one of the soldiers, Turani (Jared Ward), into custody. They are met by Javadi, who kills Turani in front of a horrified Brody.

After three days of interrogation, Brody is taken to meet Akbari, secretly armed with a cyanide-filled syringe. Akbari does not get close enough for Brody to inject him, however, and has his men send Brody to Nazir's widow Nasrin (Naz Deravian) to vet his propaganda value. Over the next few days, Brody gives a series of interviews on Iranian television denouncing the United States, leaving Saul no choice but to order his death. Carrie calls Brody, warns him that he is in danger, and pleads with him to come with her. Brody refuses, however, instead going to see Akbari and telling him about the CIA's plan. Once he has Akbari's trust, Brody overpowers and suffocates him.

Brody escapes with Carrie to a safe house, where she tells him she is pregnant with his child. While thinking a CIA extraction team was on the way, Javadi's men arrive and take Brody into custody, part of a deal the CIA made with Javadi to help him advance to greater power within the Iranian government. Brody is found guilty of being an enemy of the State, and sentenced to death. Carrie calls his cellphone to reassure him that she will save him, but he replies that he has accepted his fate and just wants it to be over. The next morning, Brody is hanged in a public square as Carrie tearfully looks on.

Four months later, Carrie — who has decided to keep Brody's child — tries unsuccessfully to persuade new CIA Director Andrew Lockhart (Tracy Letts) to give Brody a star on the CIA Memorial Wall. Lockhart refuses. She later draws a star for him with a marker pen.

=== Season 4 ===
In the fourth-season episode "Redux", Brody appears in Carrie's drug-induced hallucination. She breaks down crying in his arms, and admits that she had been willing to let him die.

== Reception ==
For his portrayal of Nicholas Brody in the premiere season of Homeland, Damian Lewis received the Primetime Emmy Award for Outstanding Lead Actor in a Drama Series. He was also nominated for the Golden Globe Award for Best Actor – Television Series Drama and Critics' Choice Television Award for Best Drama Actor. For the second season, Lewis won the Satellite Award for Best Actor – Television Series Drama and the Golden Globe Award for Best Actor – Television Series Drama. Additionally, he was nominated for the Screen Actors Guild Award for Outstanding Performance by a Male Actor in a Drama Series and the Primetime Emmy Award for Outstanding Lead Actor in a Drama Series for the second season.
