= Alex Gansa =

American screenwriter and producer

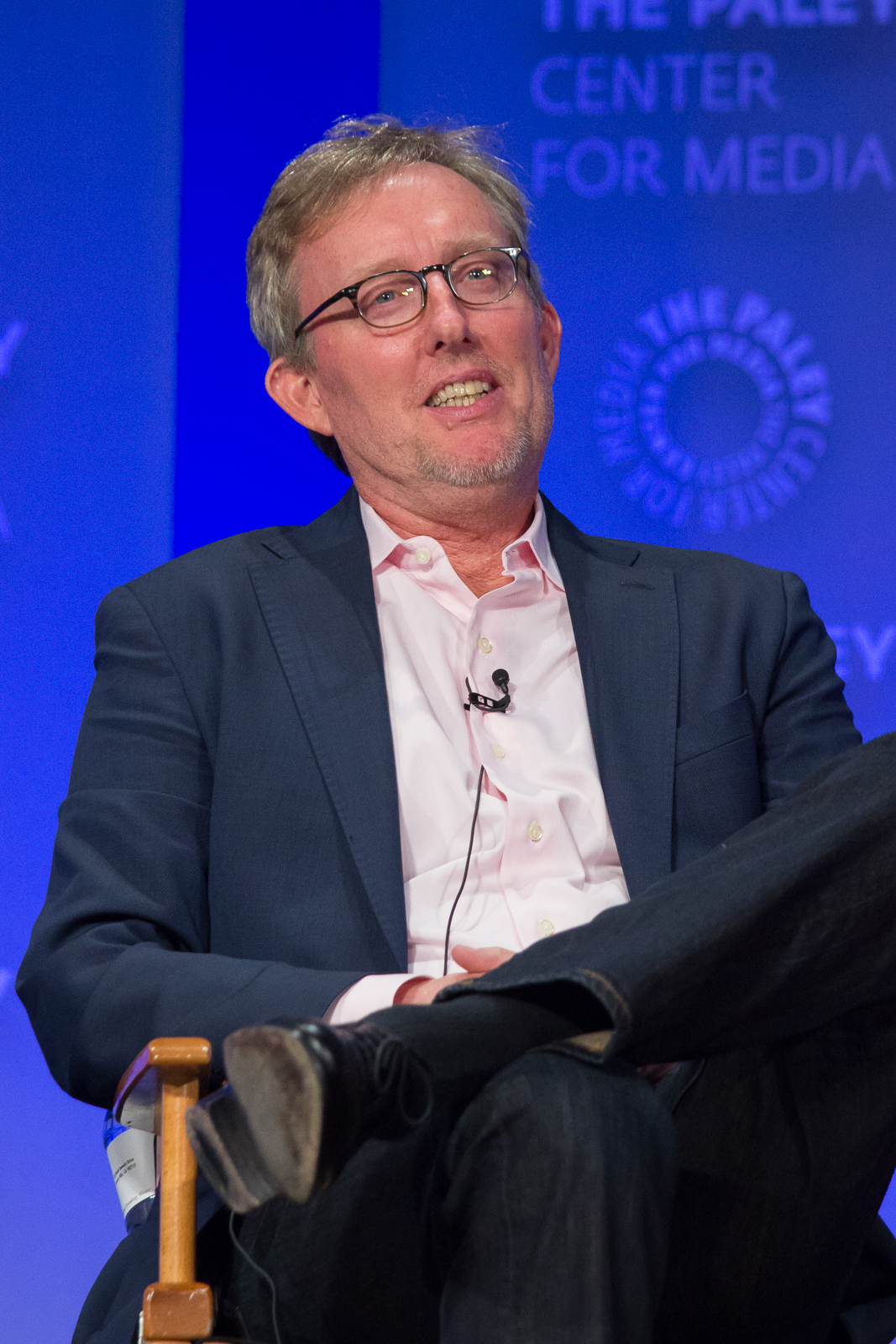
- Gansa at the 2015 PaleyFest
- Notable work: Homeland

Alex Gansa is a screenwriter and producer. He co-developed the Showtime series Homeland with Howard Gordon and Gideon Raff. He was also one of the series' executive producers and showrunners. His production company is Cherry Pie Productions.

Gansa produced and wrote a number of scripts for the Beauty and the Beast television series. Previously he worked as a writer and supervising producer on The X-Files in its first two seasons, and on Dawson's Creek in its third season. After that he was involved with the short-lived series Wolf Lake, a series focusing on a group of werewolves in Northwest America, as an executive producer and a writer. Gansa was also involved in the TV series Numb3rs and HBO's Entourage.

More recently he joined the writing crew of 24 for its seventh season. Gansa is also one of the co-creators and showrunner of Homeland, a 2011 series for Showtime.

In 2012, he was nominated and won a Primetime Emmy Award for Outstanding Writing for a Drama Series for writing the "Pilot" of Homeland, also winning an Emmy for Best Drama Series.
