= List of Homeland episodes =

Listing of episodes of American television series Homeland

Homeland is an American espionage thriller television series developed by Howard Gordon and Alex Gansa, based on the Israeli series Prisoners of War created by Gideon Raff, who serves as an executive producer on Homeland. The series stars Claire Danes as Carrie Mathison, a CIA operations officer. The first three seasons focus on Mathison's belief that an American prisoner of war, Nicholas Brody (Damian Lewis) was turned by the enemy, and now poses a significant risk to national security. The subsequent seasons follow Mathison's continued covert work. The series premiered on October 2, 2011, on Showtime, and concluded on April 26, 2020, after eight seasons and 96 episodes.

== Series overview ==
Season	Episodes	Originally released	
Season	Episodes	First released	Last released
1	12	October 2, 2011	December 18, 2011
2	12	September 30, 2012	December 16, 2012
3	12	September 29, 2013	December 15, 2013
4	12	October 5, 2014	December 21, 2014
5	12	October 4, 2015	December 20, 2015
6	12	January 15, 2017	April 9, 2017
7	12	February 11, 2018	April 29, 2018
8	12	February 9, 2020	April 26, 2020

== Episodes ==
=== Season 1 (2011) ===
No. overall	No. in season	Title	Directed by	Written by	Original release date	Prod. code	U.S. viewers (millions)
1	1	"Pilot"	Michael Cuesta	Howard Gordon & Alex Gansa & Gideon Raff	October 2, 2011	1WAH79	1.08
2	2	"Grace"	Michael Cuesta	Story by : Alex Gansa; Teleplay by : Alexander Cary	October 9, 2011	1WAH01	0.94
3	3	"Clean Skin"	Dan Attias	Chip Johannessen	October 16, 2011	1WAH02	1.08
4	4	"Semper I"	Jeffrey Nachmanoff	Howard Gordon & Alex Gansa	October 23, 2011	1WAH03	1.10
5	5	"Blind Spot"	Clark Johnson	Alexander Cary	October 30, 2011	1WAH04	1.28
6	6	"The Good Soldier"	Brad Turner	Henry Bromell	November 6, 2011	1WAH05	1.33
7	7	"The Weekend"	Michael Cuesta	Meredith Stiehm	November 13, 2011	1WAH06	1.42
8	8	"Achilles Heel"	Tucker Gates	Chip Johannessen	November 20, 2011	1WAH07	1.20
9	9	"Crossfire"	Jeffrey Nachmanoff	Alexander Cary	November 27, 2011	1WAH08	1.35
10	10	"Representative Brody"	Guy Ferland	Henry Bromell	December 4, 2011	1WAH09	1.22
11	11	"The Vest"	Clark Johnson	Meredith Stiehm & Chip Johannessen	December 11, 2011	1WAH10	1.32
12	12	"Marine One"	Michael Cuesta	Story by : Alex Gansa & Howard Gordon; Teleplay by : Alex Gansa & Chip Johannessen	December 18, 2011	1WAH11	1.71

=== Season 2 (2012) ===
No. overall	No. in season	Title	Directed by	Written by	Original release date	Prod. code	U.S. viewers (millions)
13	1	"The Smile"	Michael Cuesta	Alex Gansa & Howard Gordon	September 30, 2012	2WAH01	1.73
14	2	"Beirut Is Back"	Michael Cuesta	Chip Johannessen	October 7, 2012	2WAH02	1.66
15	3	"State of Independence"	Lodge Kerrigan	Alexander Cary	October 14, 2012	2WAH03	1.48
16	4	"New Car Smell"	David Semel	Meredith Stiehm	October 21, 2012	2WAH04	1.75
17	5	"Q&A"	Lesli Linka Glatter	Henry Bromell	October 28, 2012	2WAH05	2.07
18	6	"A Gettysburg Address"	Guy Ferland	Chip Johannessen	November 4, 2012	2WAH06	1.74
19	7	"The Clearing"	John Dahl	Meredith Stiehm	November 11, 2012	2WAH07	1.91
20	8	"I'll Fly Away"	Michael Cuesta	Story by : Howard Gordon & Chip Johannessen; Teleplay by : Chip Johannessen	November 18, 2012	2WAH08	1.87
21	9	"Two Hats"	Dan Attias	Alexander Cary	November 25, 2012	2WAH09	2.02
22	10	"Broken Hearts"	Guy Ferland	Henry Bromell	December 2, 2012	2WAH10	2.20
23	11	"In Memoriam"	Jeremy Podeswa	Chip Johannessen	December 9, 2012	2WAH11	2.36
24	12	"The Choice"	Michael Cuesta	Alex Gansa & Meredith Stiehm	December 16, 2012	2WAH12	2.29

=== Season 3 (2013) ===
No. overall	No. in season	Title	Directed by	Written by	Original release date	Prod. code	U.S. viewers (millions)
25	1	"Tin Man Is Down"	Lesli Linka Glatter	Alex Gansa & Barbara Hall	September 29, 2013	3WAH01	1.88
26	2	"Uh... Oh... Ah..."	Lesli Linka Glatter	Chip Johannessen	October 6, 2013	3WAH02	1.83
27	3	"Tower of David"	Clark Johnson	Henry Bromell & William Bromell	October 13, 2013	3WAH03	1.81
28	4	"Game On"	David Nutter	James Yoshimura & Alex Gansa	October 20, 2013	3WAH04	1.77
29	5	"The Yoga Play"	Clark Johnson	Patrick Harbinson	October 27, 2013	3WAH05	2.00
30	6	"Still Positive"	Lesli Linka Glatter	Alexander Cary	November 3, 2013	3WAH06	2.00
31	7	"Gerontion"	Carl Franklin	Chip Johannessen	November 10, 2013	3WAH07	1.85
32	8	"A Red Wheelbarrow"	Seith Mann	Alex Gansa & James Yoshimura	November 17, 2013	3WAH08	1.78
33	9	"One Last Thing"	Jeffrey Reiner	Barbara Hall	November 24, 2013	3WAH09	1.94
34	10	"Good Night"	Keith Gordon	Alexander Cary & Charlotte Stoudt	December 1, 2013	3WAH10	2.06
35	11	"Big Man in Tehran"	Daniel Minahan	Chip Johannessen & Patrick Harbinson	December 8, 2013	3WAH11	2.09
36	12	"The Star"	Lesli Linka Glatter	Alex Gansa & Meredith Stiehm	December 15, 2013	3WAH12	2.38

=== Season 4 (2014) ===
No. overall	No. in season	Title	Directed by	Written by	Original release date	Prod. code	U.S. viewers (millions)
37	1	"The Drone Queen"	Lesli Linka Glatter	Alex Gansa	October 5, 2014	4WAH01	1.61
38	2	"Trylon and Perisphere"	Keith Gordon	Chip Johannessen	October 5, 2014	4WAH02	1.61
39	3	"Shalwar Kameez"	Lesli Linka Glatter	Alexander Cary	October 12, 2014	4WAH03	1.22
40	4	"Iron in the Fire"	Michael Offer	Patrick Harbinson	October 19, 2014	4WAH04	1.35
41	5	"About a Boy"	Charlotte Sieling	Meredith Stiehm	October 26, 2014	4WAH05	1.52
42	6	"From A to B and Back Again"	Lesli Linka Glatter	Chip Johannessen	November 2, 2014	4WAH06	1.54
43	7	"Redux"	Carl Franklin	Alexander Cary	November 9, 2014	4WAH07	1.55
44	8	"Halfway to a Donut"	Alex Graves	Chip Johannessen	November 16, 2014	4WAH08	1.66
45	9	"There's Something Else Going On"	Seith Mann	Patrick Harbinson	November 23, 2014	4WAH09	1.77
46	10	"13 Hours in Islamabad"	Dan Attias	Alex Gansa & Howard Gordon	December 7, 2014	4WAH10	1.95
47	11	"Krieg Nicht Lieb"	Clark Johnson	Alexander Cary & Chip Johannessen	December 14, 2014	4WAH11	2.11
48	12	"Long Time Coming"	Lesli Linka Glatter	Meredith Stiehm	December 21, 2014	4WAH12	1.92

=== Season 5 (2015) ===
No. overall	No. in season	Title	Directed by	Written by	Original release date	Prod. code	U.S. viewers (millions)
49	1	"Separation Anxiety"	Lesli Linka Glatter	Chip Johannessen & Ted Mann	October 4, 2015	5WAH01	1.66
50	2	"The Tradition of Hospitality"	Lesli Linka Glatter	Patrick Harbinson	October 11, 2015	5WAH02	1.40
51	3	"Super Powers"	Keith Gordon	Alex Gansa & Meredith Stiehm	October 18, 2015	5WAH03	1.11
52	4	"Why Is This Night Different?"	John Coles	Ron Nyswaner	October 25, 2015	5WAH04	1.63
53	5	"Better Call Saul"	Michael Offer	Benjamin Cavell & Alex Gansa	November 1, 2015	5WAH05	1.30
54	6	"Parabiosis"	Alex Graves	Chip Johannessen & Ted Mann	November 8, 2015	5WAH06	1.35
55	7	"Oriole"	Lesli Linka Glatter	Alex Gansa & Patrick Harbinson	November 15, 2015	5WAH07	1.35
56	8	"All About Allison"	Dan Attias	Ron Nyswaner	November 22, 2015	5WAH08	1.47
57	9	"The Litvinov Ruse"	Tucker Gates	Story by : Howard Gordon & Patrick Harbinson; Teleplay by : Alex Gansa	November 29, 2015	5WAH09	1.42
58	10	"New Normal"	Dan Attias	Meredith Stiehm & Charlotte Stoudt	December 6, 2015	5WAH10	1.74
59	11	"Our Man in Damascus"	Seith Mann	David Fury	December 13, 2015	5WAH11	1.84
60	12	"A False Glimmer"	Lesli Linka Glatter	Liz Flahive & Alex Gansa & Ron Nyswaner	December 20, 2015	5WAH12	2.07

=== Season 6 (2017) ===
No. overall	No. in season	Title	Directed by	Written by	Original release date	Prod. code	U.S. viewers (millions)
61	1	"Fair Game"	Keith Gordon	Alex Gansa & Ted Mann	January 15, 2017 (Note: "Fair Game" was released online and on demand by Showtime on December 30, 2016, ahead of its broadcast on television.)	6WAH01	1.08
62	2	"The Man in the Basement"	Keith Gordon	Chip Johannessen	January 22, 2017	6WAH02	1.45
63	3	"The Covenant"	Lesli Linka Glatter	Ron Nyswaner	January 29, 2017	6WAH03	1.13
64	4	"A Flash of Light"	Lesli Linka Glatter	Patrick Harbinson	February 12, 2017	6WAH04	1.05
65	5	"Casus Belli"	Alex Graves	Chip Johannessen	February 19, 2017	6WAH05	1.07
66	6	"The Return"	Alex Graves	Charlotte Stoudt	February 26, 2017	6WAH06	0.90
67	7	"Imminent Risk"	Tucker Gates	Ron Nyswaner	March 5, 2017	6WAH07	1.44
68	8	"alt.truth"	Lesli Linka Glatter	Patrick Harbinson	March 12, 2017	6WAH08	1.27
69	9	"Sock Puppets"	Dan Attias	Chip Johannessen & Evan Wright	March 19, 2017	6WAH09	1.26
70	10	"The Flag House"	Michael Klick	Alex Gansa	March 26, 2017	6WAH10	1.43
71	11	"R Is for Romeo"	Seith Mann	Chip Johannessen & Patrick Harbinson	April 2, 2017	6WAH11	1.34
72	12	"America First"	Lesli Linka Glatter	Alex Gansa & Ron Nyswaner	April 9, 2017	6WAH12	1.90

=== Season 7 (2018) ===
No. overall	No. in season	Title	Directed by	Written by	Original release date	Prod. code	U.S. viewers (millions)
73	1	"Enemy of the State"	Lesli Linka Glatter	Debora Cahn & Alex Gansa	February 11, 2018	7WAH01	1.22
74	2	"Rebel Rebel"	Lesli Linka Glatter	Patrick Harbinson & Chip Johannessen	February 18, 2018	7WAH02	1.12
75	3	"Standoff"	Michael Klick	Anya Leta & Ron Nyswaner	February 25, 2018	7WAH03	1.26
76	4	"Like Bad at Things"	Alex Graves	Chip Johannessen & Patrick Harbinson	March 4, 2018	7WAH04	0.93
77	5	"Active Measures"	Charlotte Sieling	Debora Cahn	March 11, 2018	7WAH05	1.32
78	6	"Species Jump"	Michael Offer	Anya Leta & Ron Nyswaner	March 18, 2018	7WAH06	1.25
79	7	"Andante"	Lesli Linka Glatter	Patrick Harbinson & Chip Johannessen	March 25, 2018	7WAH07	1.28
80	8	"Lies, Amplifiers, Fucking Twitter"	Tucker Gates	Patrick Harbinson & Chip Johannessen	April 1, 2018	7WAH08	1.22
81	9	"Useful Idiot"	Nelson McCormick	Debora Cahn	April 8, 2018	7WAH09	1.24
82	10	"Clarity"	Dan Attias	Howard Gordon & Ron Nyswaner	April 15, 2018	7WAH10	1.28
83	11	"All In"	Alex Graves	Patrick Harbinson & Chip Johannessen	April 22, 2018	7WAH11	1.39
84	12	"Paean to the People"	Lesli Linka Glatter	Alex Gansa	April 29, 2018	7WAH12	1.30

=== Season 8 (2020) ===
No. overall	No. in season	Title	Directed by	Written by	Original release date	Prod. code	U.S. viewers (millions)
85	1	"Deception Indicated"	Lesli Linka Glatter	Debora Cahn & Alex Gansa	February 9, 2020	8WAH01	0.60
86	2	"Catch and Release"	Lesli Linka Glatter	Patrick Harbinson & Chip Johannessen	February 16, 2020	8WAH02	0.68
87	3	"False Friends"	Keith Gordon	Alex Gansa & Howard Gordon	February 23, 2020	8WAH03	0.71
88	4	"Chalk One Up"	Seith Mann	Patrick Harbinson & Chip Johannessen	March 1, 2020	8WAH04	0.73
89	5	"Chalk Two Down"	Alex Graves	Patrick Harbinson & Chip Johannessen	March 8, 2020	8WAH05	0.82
90	6	"Two Minutes"	Tucker Gates	Debora Cahn	March 15, 2020	8WAH06	0.71
91	7	"Fucker Shot Me"	Lesli Linka Glatter	Patrick Harbinson & Chip Johannessen	March 22, 2020	8WAH07	1.09
92	8	"Threnody(s)"	Michael Klick	Patrick Harbinson & Chip Johannessen	March 29, 2020	8WAH08	0.75
93	9	"In Full Flight"	Dan Attias	Alex Gansa & Howard Gordon	April 5, 2020	8WAH09	0.81
94	10	"Designated Driver"	Michael Offer	Patrick Harbinson & Chip Johannessen	April 12, 2020	8WAH10	0.89
95	11	"The English Teacher"	Michael Cuesta	Patrick Harbinson & Chip Johannessen	April 19, 2020	8WAH11	0.96
96	12	"Prisoners of War"	Lesli Linka Glatter	Alex Gansa & Howard Gordon	April 26, 2020	8WAH12	1.26

== Home video releases ==
Season	Episodes	DVD and Blu-ray release dates		
Season	Episodes	Region 1	Region 2	Region 4
1	12	August 28, 2012	September 10, 2012	September 19, 2012
2	12	September 10, 2013	September 23, 2013	September 12, 2013
3	12	September 9, 2014	September 8, 2014	September 24, 2014
4	12	September 8, 2015	June 15, 2015	April 29, 2015
5	12	January 10, 2017	April 25, 2016	April 27, 2016
6	12	February 6, 2018	July 3, 2017	July 19, 2017

== Ratings ==
Homeland : U.S. viewers per episode (millions)

Season	Episode number												Average
Season	1	2	3	4	5	6	7	8	9	10	11	12	Average
1	1.08	0.94	1.08	1.10	1.28	1.33	1.42	1.20	1.35	1.22	1.32	1.71	1.25
2	1.73	1.66	1.48	1.75	2.07	1.74	1.91	1.87	2.02	2.20	2.36	2.29	1.92
3	1.88	1.83	1.81	1.77	2.00	2.00	1.85	1.78	1.94	2.06	2.09	2.38	1.95
4	1.61	1.61	1.22	1.35	1.52	1.54	1.55	1.66	1.77	1.95	2.11	1.92	1.65
5	1.66	1.40	1.11	1.63	1.30	1.35	1.35	1.47	1.42	1.74	1.84	2.07	1.53
6	1.08	1.45	1.13	1.05	1.07	0.90	1.44	1.27	1.26	1.43	1.34	1.90	1.28
7	1.22	1.12	1.26	0.93	1.32	1.25	1.28	1.22	1.24	1.28	1.39	1.30	1.23
8	0.60	0.68	0.71	0.73	0.82	0.71	1.09	0.75	0.81	0.89	0.96	1.26	0.83

Audience measurement performed by Nielsen Media Research
