= Homeland season 7 =

Season of television series

Homeland
- Season 7
- Home media cover art
- Starring: Claire Danes; Elizabeth Marvel; Maury Sterling; Linus Roache; Jake Weber; Morgan Spector; Mandy Patinkin
- No. of episodes: 12

Release
- Original network: Showtime
- Original release: February 11 – April 29, 2018

Season chronology
- ← Previous; Season 6 Next → Season 8

The seventh season of the American television drama series Homeland premiered on February 11, 2018, and concluded on April 29, 2018, on Showtime, consisting of 12 episodes. The series started as a loosely based variation of the two-season run of the Israeli television series Hatufim (חטופים; English: Prisoners of War) created by Gideon Raff and is developed for American television by Howard Gordon and Alex Gansa.

== Plot ==
Carrie has left her job in the White House and is living with her sister Maggie. She takes on the Keane administration to secure the release of the 200 members of the intelligence community who were arrested under President Keane's orders the previous season, only to discover a much wider conspiracy against the President.

== Cast and characters ==
=== Main ===
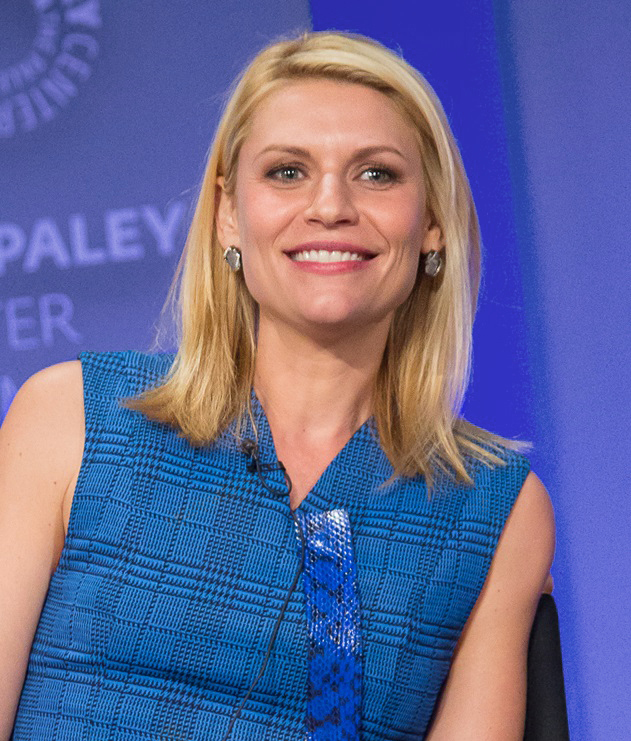
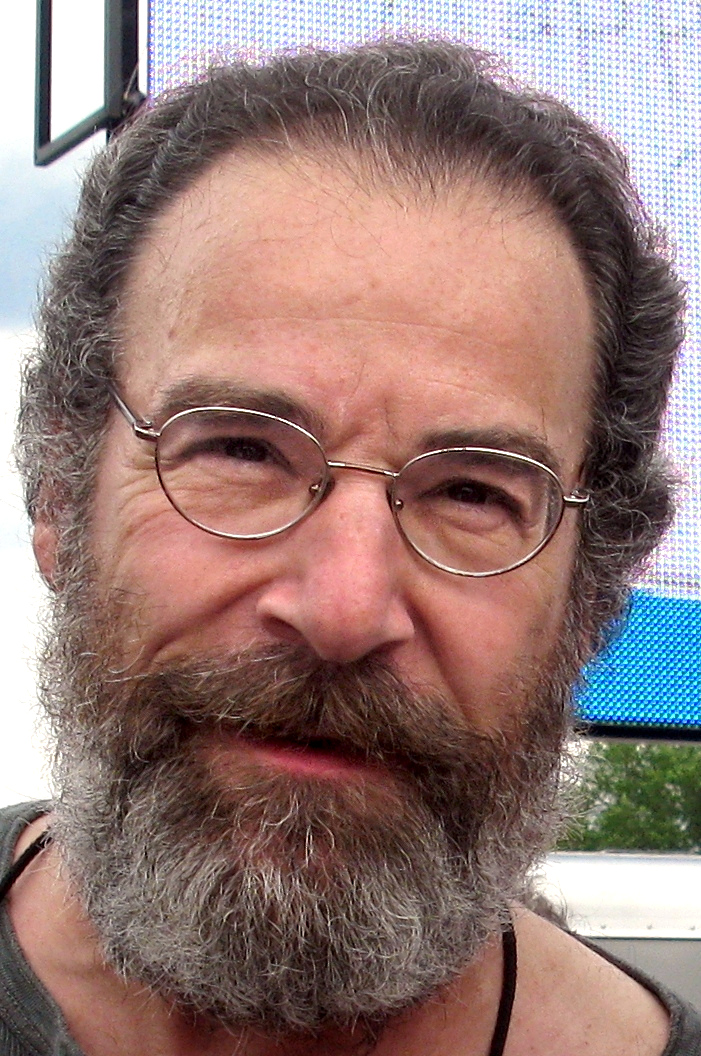
Claire Danes, Mandy Patinkin (left to right) portray lead roles Carrie Mathison and Saul Berenson, respectively.
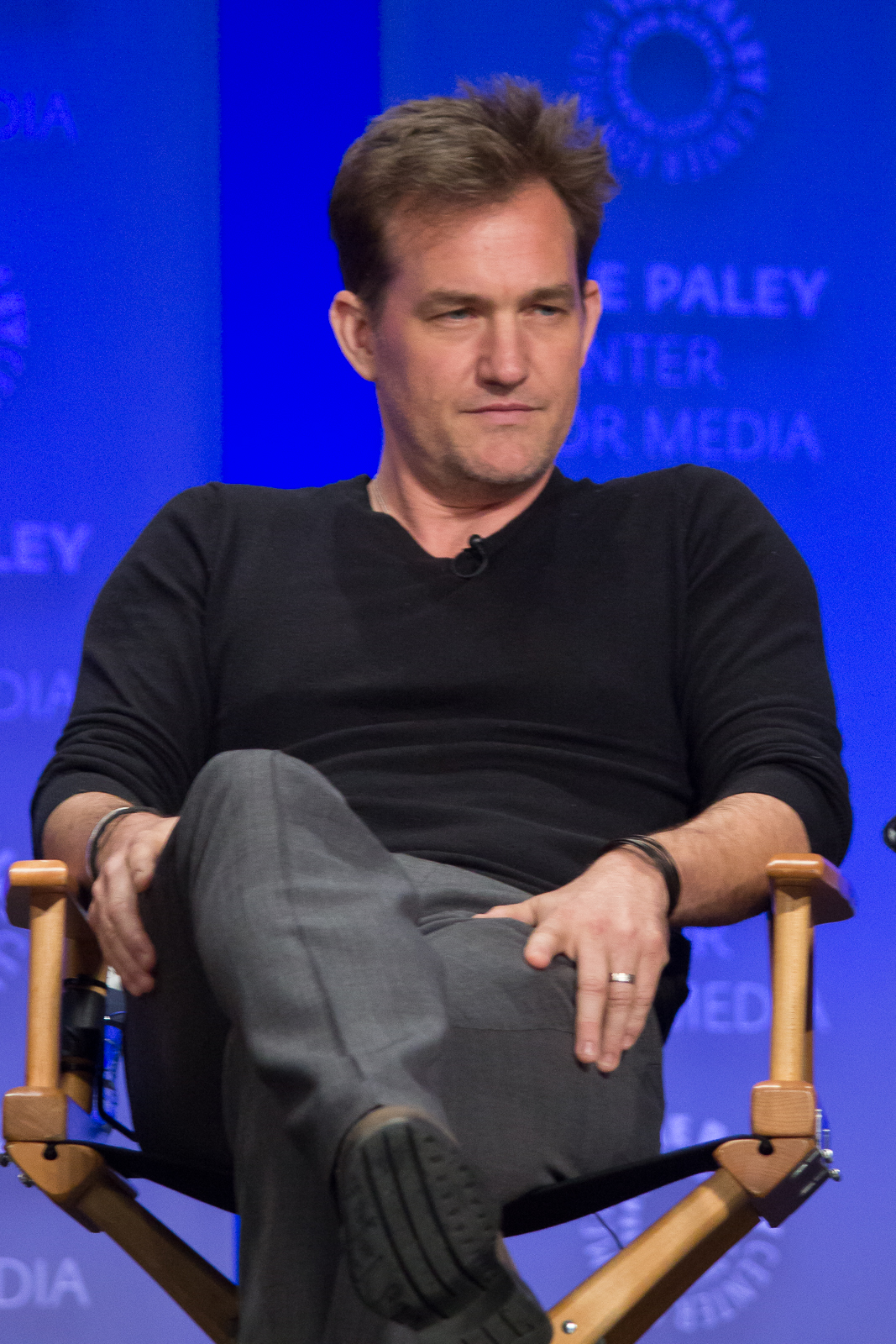
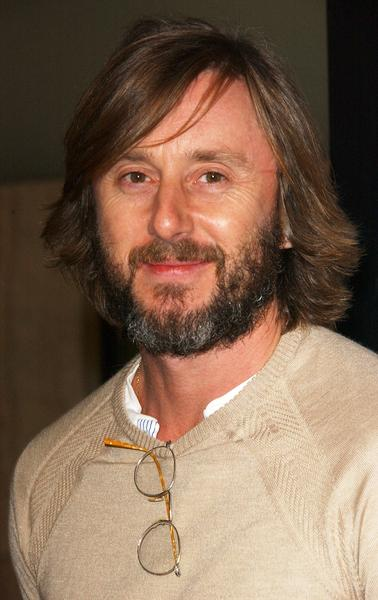
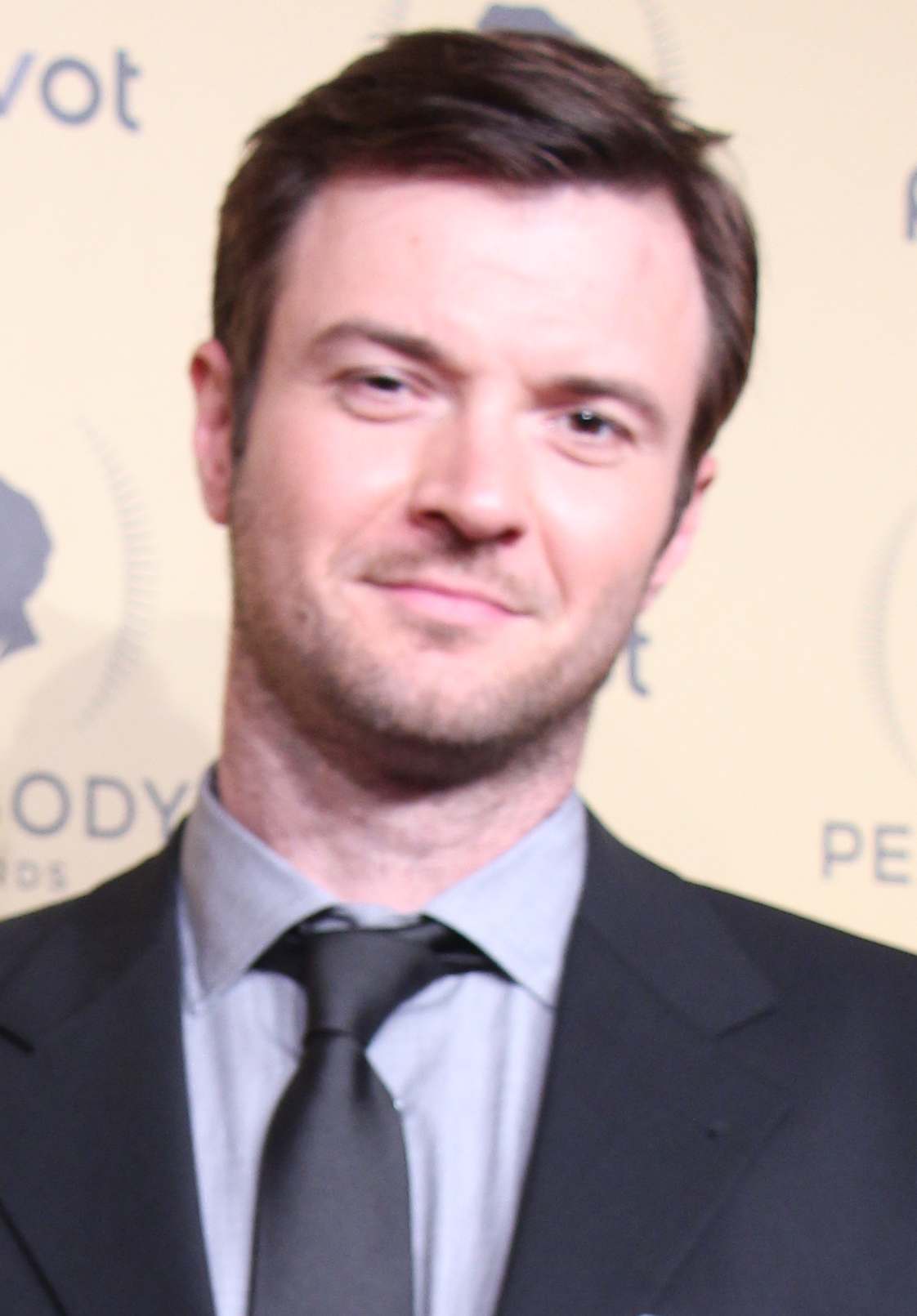
Maury Sterling, Jake Weber and Costa Ronin (left to right) portray Max Piotrowski, Brett O'Keefe and Yevgeny Gromov, respectively.
- Claire Danes as Carrie Mathison, former CIA member and former White House advisor to President Keane now residing in Washington, D.C., with her sister Maggie
- Elizabeth Marvel as Elizabeth Keane, the current President of the United States
- Maury Sterling as Max Piotrowski, a freelance surveillance expert
- Linus Roache as David Wellington, White House Chief of Staff
- Jake Weber as Brett O'Keefe, a right-wing TV host and provocateur
- Morgan Spector as Dante Allen, an FBI agent and old friend of Carrie’s who is looking into the hundreds of people President Keane has detained
- Mandy Patinkin as Saul Berenson, Carrie's former boss and mentor and the new National Security Advisor

=== Recurring ===
- Amy Hargreaves as Maggie Mathison, M.D., Carrie's sister
- Dylan Baker as Sam Paley, a maverick United States Senator from Arizona who is leading an aggressive investigation into the Keane administration
- Ellen Adair as Janet Bayne, Paley's Chief of Staff
- Mackenzie Astin as Bill Dunn, Carrie's brother-in-law and Maggie's husband who works for the Treasury Department
- Courtney Grosbeck as Josie Mathison-Dunn, Carrie's niece and Maggie's daughter who is staunchly anti-Keane
- Lesli Margherita as Sharon Aldright, O'Keefe's assistant
- Claire and McKenna Keane as Frances "Franny" Mathison, Carrie and Brody's daughter
- Sandrine Holt as Simone Martin, Wellington's girlfriend who Carrie suspects is an undercover Russian military intelligence officer
- Matt Servitto as FBI Special Agent Maslin, the commander of the FBI unit searching for O'Keefe
- Sakina Jaffrey as Dr. Lori Meyer, Carrie's psychiatrist
- David Maldonado as Bo Elkins, who provides sanctuary to O'Keefe
- Annie Humphrey as Mary Elkins, Bo's wife
- Colton Ryan as J.J. Elkins, Bo's son
- Costa Ronin as Lieutenant Colonel Yevgeny Gromov, a Russian GRU Senior Operations Officer
- James D'Arcy as Thomas Anson, a former special ops agent who helps Carrie
- William Popp as Stein, a member of Thomas Anson's team
- Clé Bennett as Dominique "Doxie" Marquis, also a member of Anson's team
- Ari Fliakos as Carter Bennet, also a member of Anson's team
- Catherine Curtin as Sandy Langmore, a former CIA officer, professor and member of Saul's Russia task force
- Peter Vack as Clint Prower, a computer expert and a member of Saul's task force
- Beau Bridges as Vice President Ralph Warner
- Elya Baskin as Viktor Makarov, Ambassador of Russia to the United States
- Merab Ninidze as Colonel Sergei Mirov, Yevgeny's GRU superior
- Damian Young as Jim, head of the CIA's Moscow Station

=== Guest ===
- Robert Knepper as General Jamie McClendon
- Julee Cerda as Reiko Umon, an aide to President Keane
- Barbara Rosenblat as Attorney General Hoberman
- Frederic Lehne as General Rossen
- Mark Ivanir as Ivan Krupin, a former Russian intelligence agent
- Jennifer Ferrin as Charlotte, a Russian agent
- Tricia Paoluccio as Audrey Navarro, Dante's ex-wife
- Thomas G. Waites as Clayton, a Russian agent
- Adrienne C. Moore as Rhonda, Carrie's lawyer
- Marin Hinkle as Christine Lonas, a youth care social worker
- F. Murray Abraham as Dar Adal
- Geoff Pierson as Senator Richard Eames, a member of the Senate Intelligence Committee

== Episodes ==
No. overall	No. in season	Title	Directed by	Written by	Original release date	Prod. code	U.S. viewers (millions)
73	1	"Enemy of the State"	Lesli Linka Glatter	Debora Cahn & Alex Gansa	February 11, 2018	7WAH01	1.22
Carrie and Franny are living in Washington, D.C., with Carrie's sister Maggie and her family. Carrie has left her job at the White House and is actively working to secure the release of 200 federal employees Keane has arrested since her inauguration. She plots to arrange a meeting between Dante Allen, her contact at the FBI, and Senator Sam Paley, hoping to get Dante to testify in Paley's Congressional investigation into Keane's misconduct, but Dante refuses to speak with him. Maggie is furious when she learns that Carrie involved Maggie's teenage daughter, Josie, in her scheme and that Josie left Franny alone with her boyfriend. Saul is still in federal prison; David Wellington, Keane's chief of staff, offers him the position of National Security Advisor, but he says he will accept it only if the 200 imprisoned federal employees are released. Carrie has Max install surveillance on Wellington. Keane is incensed when a military tribunal sentences General Jamie McClendon, who spearheaded the conspiracy to assassinate her, to life in prison rather than to death; she tells Wellington she will find someone to "fix" the situation. McClendon dies in custody after being poisoned.
74	2	"Rebel Rebel"	Lesli Linka Glatter	Patrick Harbinson & Chip Johannessen	February 18, 2018	7WAH02	1.12
Carrie spots an unknown woman entering Wellington's apartment on a surveillance camera. Dante refuses to help her, so she posts a screenshot of the woman on a 4chan thread in an attempt to identify her, but is tricked by a hacker into downloading a virus that encrypts her hard drive with ransomware. Carrie uses sex to lure the hacker to a face-to-face and beats him until he unlocks her computer, threatening to kill him if he ever tries anything else. Brett O'Keefe, now a fugitive, takes shelter in Lucasville, Ohio with the staunchly right-wing Elkins family and makes a broadcast accusing Keane of arranging McClendon's death. In an effort to mend public perception, Wellington convinces Keane to release the 200 arrested federal employees and appoint Saul as National Security Advisor. Wellington places Saul in charge of the manhunt for O'Keefe. Saul identifies O'Keefe's location.
75	3	"Standoff"	Michael Klick	Anya Leta & Ron Nyswaner	February 25, 2018	7WAH03	1.26
Carrie's psychiatrist confirms that her medication is no longer working and prescribes a new treatment. Dante arrives at her house while she is heavily sedated; he identifies the woman in Wellington's apartment as Simone Martin, Wellington's girlfriend, and tells Carrie that Simone received a parking ticket close to McClendon's prison the day before McClendon died. Carrie breaks into Simone's apartment and collects evidence, but is arrested by police outside after neighbors report the break-in; Dante pulls strings to get her released and to have the arrest expunged from the record. Saul arrives at the Elkins' property with FBI agents and attempts to negotiate with O'Keefe. However, the family calls in armed reinforcements, leading to a standoff with the FBI. Realizing that the White House is losing control of the O'Keefe situation and needs to change the narrative, Wellington authorizes an airstrike on a Syrian weapons convoy that Keane has rejected, falsely claiming to now have her approval.
76	4	"Like Bad at Things"	Alex Graves	Chip Johannessen & Patrick Harbinson	March 4, 2018	7WAH04	0.93
Keane visits Wellington, and Carrie overhears him telling Keane it was he who authorized the airstrike. With Max's assistance, Carrie continues her investigation into Simone's movements. Maggie, upset that Carrie is not following her new treatment plan, forces her to take her medication; she goes to a friend to obtain other drugs to help her keep alert. Carrie recruits Dante to help her prove that Simone was working for Wellington when she made suspicious withdrawals totalling $50,000. Saul and O'Keefe lose control of the situation on the Elkins' property. The Elkins' teenage son J.J. is shot by an FBI patrol, and an FBI agent is taken hostage in retaliation. Paramedics are allowed to take J.J. to a hospital, where a man takes photos that are leaked to the press as evidence that J.J. is dead. Saul calls O'Keefe to warn him that the report is false, but O'Keefe does not pass this information on and J.J.'s father, enraged by the news, executes the captive FBI agent. An ensuing firefight results in several casualties, largely on the Elkins' side. O'Keefe survives and is taken into custody.
77	5	"Active Measures"	Charlotte Sieling	Debora Cahn	March 11, 2018	7WAH05	1.32
Amid concern over possible violence at an upcoming memorial for victims of the Lucasville massacre organized by people from there, Keane urges the wives of slain FBI agents to attend it. The event ultimately proceeds without incident after Mrs. Elkins welcomes the three women to the service. The result is a public relations victory for Keane. Saul visits Ivan Krupin in witness protection and presents his theory that Russian operative Yevgeny Gromov was responsible for the fake news story that sparked the Lucasville shootout, but Krupin says it is doubtful. Carrie assembles a team of former CIA colleagues, along with Dante and Max, to try to connect Wellington to McClendon's murder. Three team members, posing as the prison guards who received the payoff, force Simone to confirm that the $50,000 was a payment for the murder and demand that she get them an additional $100,000. Carrie expects that Simone will report this to Wellington, her presumed handler, but when she immediately goes to see him she says nothing about it.
78	6	"Species Jump"	Michael Offer	Anya Leta & Ron Nyswaner	March 18, 2018	7WAH06	1.25
Saul sets up a team to find Yevgeny. Simone is subpoenaed by Senator Paley's subcommittee; at a proffer session, she requests immunity in exchange for naming the individual who ordered her to deliver the $50,000. Carrie realizes that Simone plans to implicate Wellington, who Carrie now believes is innocent; she explains the situation to Saul, who helps her realize that Dante is likely setting her up and tells her Dante may be part of a Russian conspiracy to link McClendon's death to the White House. Carrie drugs Dante and has the rest of her team search his apartment while he is unconscious. Saul learns that a viral video of Wellington confronting Simone was disseminated by the same social media network that planted the fake story about J.J. Elkins, which leads him to believe the network is linked to Yevgeny. Ivan evades his FBI protection; after confronting Yevgeny, he asks Saul for a meeting, but when Saul reaches the meeting place, Ivan is no longer there, having been abducted by Yevgeny, who has him drowned.
79	7	"Andante"	Lesli Linka Glatter	Patrick Harbinson & Chip Johannessen	March 25, 2018	7WAH07	1.28
Saul informs Wellington that Simone is a Russian agent and that she intends to implicate him in the conspiracy to murder McClendon. A stunned Wellington sends a letter of resignation to Keane, who refuses it. Saul forces Max to join his task force; they identify five occasions when Dante and Simone concurrently traveled to the same European cities, and Saul decides to pursue Dante. Carrie has an argument with Maggie and leaves the house with Franny; Dante allows them to stay with him at his apartment. Carrie tracks down Dante's ex-wife, who tells her that their marriage broke down due to Dante's resentment towards Carrie after being sent home in disgrace from Kabul four years earlier. Dante visits Maggie's house under the guise of collecting Franny's belongings and finds evidence that Carrie has compiled on him; as well, his ex-wife tells him about Carrie's visit. He confronts Carrie at his apartment that night about her discussion with his ex-wife, which leads to them having sex, but they are interrupted when Saul's team charge in and arrest Dante.
80	8	"Lies, Amplifiers, Fucking Twitter"	Tucker Gates	Patrick Harbinson & Chip Johannessen	April 1, 2018	7WAH08	1.22
Carrie convinces Saul to let her interrogate Dante; she presents their evidence to him, but fails to get him to talk without a lawyer. She goes to speak with Maggie, who admonishes her over the trauma she has inflicted on Franny and gives her a choice between seeking treatment and giving up custody of Franny to Maggie. Keane, facing pressure to resign from Senator Paley, has Wellington warn Moscow that the U.S. will treat Simone's testimony as a hostile act. The Russian ambassador notifies Yevgeny, whose team extracts Simone (who is revealed to be his lover) from the safehouse where Paley is keeping her. Carrie and Saul have an agent posing as a lawyer poison Dante using ink from a pen he was given to sign paperwork; before entering cardiac arrest, Dante, believing the Russians have poisoned him, says to Carrie that Simone told him the Russians poisoned McClendon. Saul and Carrie learn that Simone has escaped, leaving Dante (whose survival is in question) as their only witness.
81	9	"Useful Idiot"	Nelson McCormick	Debora Cahn	April 8, 2018	7WAH09	1.24
Saul and Wellington meet with Senator Paley and convince him of the Russians' subterfuge, including Paley's own unwitting role. In a hospital, Dante tells Carrie he will cooperate by confirming he and Simone were Russian assets; he informs her that the Russians have a secret Twitter code that would alert Yevgeny's agents to dissolve their network. Saul's team deploy the Twitter code to identify other members of the network; on being informed that the code has been deployed, Yevgeny realizes that Dante is cooperating with the authorities, and defies his handlers by tracking Dante down at the hospital. Carrie learns from Maggie's husband, Bill, that Maggie is consulting a lawyer about taking custody of Franny; she races to Franny's school to leave with her. Dante calls Carrie and warns her that Yevgeny is in his hospital room; she rushes to save him, nearly hitting a frantic Franny with her car as she leaves the school. She arrives at the hospital only to learn that Dante is already dead, and suffers a severe psychotic break triggered by the shock of nearly killing her own daughter.
82	10	"Clarity"	Dan Attias	Howard Gordon & Ron Nyswaner	April 15, 2018	7WAH10	1.28
Following Dante's death, Paley changes his mind and pushes to obtain the votes of enough members of Keane's Cabinet to invoke the Twenty-fifth Amendment to the United States Constitution and have her removed from office; Keane pre-emptively fires four Cabinet secretaries she distrusts. When Keane refuses to reverse her decision, Vice President Ralph Warner tells her he will present the Senate with a document declaring Keane unfit for office. Carrie undergoes another round of electroconvulsive therapy following her psychotic episode in the hospital. With Dante dead, Saul makes plans to exfiltrate Simone from Russia and requests Carrie's help in overseeing the mission. Carrie declines because she needs to change her life to be able to keep Franny. At a custody hearing the next day, Maggie testifies that Carrie is incapable of providing Franny with a stable home environment. Carrie decides to give up the custody battle and accepts a visitation agreement granting her access to Franny every other weekend. She takes up Saul's offer to lead the Russia operation.
83	11	"All In"	Alex Graves	Patrick Harbinson & Chip Johannessen	April 22, 2018	7WAH11	1.39
Senator Paley visits Dar Adal in jail for insight on Saul's motives in Russia; Dar tells him Saul must be running a covert operation there. Paley's chief of staff learns that Simone is still alive and, when Paley balks at doing so, tells the Russian ambassador about Saul's intention to extract her. In Moscow, Saul and Carrie sit down with SVR and GRU representatives, including Yevgeny, as a ruse to lure Yevgeny away from Simone. As they speak, Carrie's special ops team storms Simone's safehouse, only to be ambushed by armed guards. Carrie devises an alternative plan: confiscate $300M hidden in U.S. banks by SVR General Yakushin, and use it to leverage him into finding Simone. Yakushin reacts by sending an armed battalion to GRU headquarters, where Simone has been moved, sparking chaos on the streets. Carrie tells Simone she is now expendable to Yevgeny and convinces her she needs to leave Russia. Carrie and Simone wear wigs matching each other's hair and escape in separate cars; Yevgeny identifies Carrie's car as the one carrying Simone. In Washington, Warner relieves Keane of her command.
84	12	"Paean to the People"	Lesli Linka Glatter	Alex Gansa	April 29, 2018	7WAH12	1.30
Carrie diverts the Russians long enough for Saul and his team to reach the airport with Simone, but they are blocked from entering it. Warner, aware of Saul's mission and over Paley's objection, intervenes to have the Russian government let them go; they depart for the U.S. having no choice but to leave without Carrie, who is captured by Yevgeny. Simone testifies in Congress and confirms that the GRU plotted to sabotage the Keane administration; Paley is arrested as a conspirator. Keane is reinstated as President, but in her first public address, she speaks of the divisions in the country and announces that she will be resigning in favor of Warner, because she feels she has become part of the problem. Yevgeny threatens to withhold Carrie's medication unless she makes a statement that the CIA was responsible for the entire crisis, but she refuses. Seven months later, Saul secures Carrie's release in exchange for several Russian prisoners. When he receives her, he finds Carrie in severe delirium after all this time without her medication.

== Production ==
The series was renewed for a seventh and eighth season in August 2016. For this season, Maury Sterling, Jake Weber and Linus Roache were promoted to series regulars; Sterling has been recurring since the first season, while Weber and Roache both first appeared in the sixth season. The seventh season began production on September 11, 2017, filming in Richmond, Virginia. Filming wrapped in Budapest, Hungary on March 29, 2018.

The writers initially planned for the series' seventh and eighth seasons to comprise a two-season arc, but current events surrounding the U.S. government convinced them to instead continue the arc from Season 6 into Season 7. Showrunner Alex Gansa said "Given the swirl of news about the Administration’s war with its own intelligence community, “It was just hard not to do it. It was hard to say ‘OK, let’s go tell a story in Paris. Let’s go tell a story in South America.’ Something very significant is happening in all our lives right now”.

== Reception ==
=== Critical response ===
The seventh season of Homeland received generally positive reviews from critics, who particularly praised the second half. On Metacritic, the season (based on the first episode only) has a score of 65 out of 100 based on 6 reviews. On Rotten Tomatoes, it has an approval rating of 81% with an average rating of 7.7 out of 10 based on 140 reviews. The site's critical consensus is, "Though it lacks the series' patented agonizing suspense, Homeland's seventh season remains an engaging drama by embracing its pulpier elements and pitting Claire Danes' magnetic protagonist against the White House."

=== Accolades ===
For the 70th Primetime Emmy Awards, the series received two nominations–Mandy Patinkin for Outstanding Supporting Actor in a Drama Series and F. Murray Abraham for Outstanding Guest Actor in a Drama Series. Alex Gansa won the Writers Guild of America Award for Television: Episodic Drama for "Paean to the People" at the 71st Writers Guild of America Awards.
