= Rebel Rebel (Homeland) =

- Homeland episode
- Episode no.: Season 7 Episode 2
- Directed by: Lesli Linka Glatter
- Written by: Patrick Harbinson; Chip Johannessen
- Production code: 7WAH02
- Original air date: February 18, 2018
- Running time: 56 minutes

Guest appearances
- Amy Hargreaves as Maggie Mathison; Sandrine Holt as Simone Martin; Matt Servitto as Agent Maslin; Dylan Baker as Senator Sam Paley; Sakina Jaffrey as psychiatrist; Mackenzie Astin as Bill Dunn; Lesli Margherita as Sharon Aldright; Courtney Grosbeck as Josie Mathison-Dunn; David Maldonado as Bo Elkins; Julee Cerda as Reiko Umon; Barbara Rosenblat as Attorney General Hoberman; Colton Ryan as J.J. Elkins

Episode chronology
← Previous "Enemy of the State"	Next → "Standoff"
- Homeland season 7

"Rebel Rebel" is the second episode of the seventh season of the American television drama series Homeland, and the 74th episode overall. It premiered on Showtime on February 18, 2018.

== Plot ==
Carrie (Claire Danes) sees an unknown woman (Sandrine Holt) enter Wellington's house while watching her surveillance camera feeds. Desperate to identify her, she posts a screen capture of the woman on the 4chan political board, asking if anyone can identify her. A hacker responds to the post, and lures Carrie into downloading a file which infects her laptop with ransomware. The hard drive is encrypted with a demand for a $5,000 payment in bitcoin.

Brett O’Keefe (Jake Weber), being harbored by the Elkins family, makes another broadcast where he accuses President Keane of being somehow involved in the death of General McClendon. Keane (Elizabeth Marvel) is concerned with the public perception as she agrees McClendon's death looks suspicious. Wellington (Linus Roache) convinces Keane to go forward with his proposal: release the 200 federal employees who were arrested, and appoint Saul (Mandy Patinkin) as National Security Advisor. Saul's first assignment from Wellington is to oversee the manhunt for O'Keefe's hideout.

Max (Maury Sterling) has no luck dealing with Carrie's laptop. While they talk about it, the hacker starts talking back to them, revealing he has been listening via the laptop's microphone. He then escalates the ransom to $10,000, then $20,000 to decrypt Carrie's hard drive. Max leaves and Carrie talks to the hacker who threatens to go public with proof of her spying on Wellington. Not having the money to pay the ransom, Carrie improvises and tries to seduce the hacker by doing a striptease on her webcam. After going along with his requests briefly, she insists on a face-to-face meeting. When they meet, Carrie hints at a sexual encounter, but when the hacker gets close she headbutts him and attacks him with an expandable baton concealed in her boot. After beating the hacker into submission, she forces him to unlock her laptop, reveals she is CIA and threatens to kill him if he tries anything with her again.

== Production ==
The episode was directed by executive producer Lesli Linka Glatter and co-written by executive producers Patrick Harbinson and Chip Johannessen.

== Reception ==
=== Reviews ===
The episode received an approval rating of 83% on the review aggregator Rotten Tomatoes based on 12 reviews. The website's critical consensus is, "Carrie Mathieson squares off against a hacker in a seedy subplot that stretches credulity but is carried off with aplomb by Claire Danes."

There was some criticism regarding Carrie's main arc being of questionable import. Scott Von Doviak of The A.V. Club' gave the episode a "B−" grade, concluding about Carrie's arc "What follows is suspenseful enough as far as it goes, mainly because director Lesli Linka Glatter is a pro... but it’s hard to shake off the feeling that it’s all completely unnecessary". Entertainment Weekly's Shirley Li also rated the episode a B− and had a similar thesis: "it’s great to see Carrie back in action, and yes, she could use a W after all of that, but was all of that really necessary? Did that bring us any closer to this season’s endgame?".

=== Ratings ===
The original broadcast was watched by 1.12 million viewers.
