= Like Bad at Things =

- Homeland episode
- Episode no.: Season 7 Episode 4
- Directed by: Alex Graves
- Written by: Chip Johannessen; Patrick Harbinson
- Production code: 7WAH04
- Original air date: March 4, 2018
- Running time: 48 minutes

Guest appearances
- Amy Hargreaves as Maggie Mathison; Matt Servitto as Agent Maslin; David Maldonado as Bo Elkins; Colton Ryan as J.J. Elkins; Alex Hurt as Josh; Costa Ronin as Yevgeny Gromov; David Neal Levin as Carl; Justin Kucsulain as Andy Burke

Episode chronology
← Previous "Standoff"	Next → "Active Measures"
- Homeland season 7

"Like Bad at Things" is the fourth episode of the seventh season of the American television drama series Homeland, and the 76th episode overall. It premiered on Showtime on March 4, 2018.

== Plot ==
President Keane (Elizabeth Marvel) is livid when Wellington (Linus Roache) admits to ordering the air strike on her behalf after she refused to do it. Carrie (Claire Danes) witnesses the whole confrontation on her surveillance cameras. Carrie and Max (Maury Sterling) also look into Simone Martin's movements on the day that McClendon died. By accessing her E-ZPass logs, Max learns that her route took her to five separate cash advance locations.

In the midst of the standoff at Bo Elkins' compound, his teenaged son, J.J., chases his dog through the woods. He encounters an FBI patrol, who shoot the dog as it rushes towards them. J.J. raises his rifle and is also shot. As the patrollers tend to J.J., they are ambushed by Bo (David Maldonado) and several of his friends. They take J.J. as well as a hostage: Agent Goodman. Two paramedics are permitted into the compound to extract the severely wounded J.J. One of them secretly plants a listening device, enabling the FBI detail to monitor the conversations inside. At the hospital, a man (Costa Ronin) enters and puts on scrubs, posing as a doctor. He sneaks into the room where J.J. is being treated, takes several photos from behind the curtain, and gets away undetected.

Carrie, not wanting to deal with the side effects of Seroquel, buys some black market meds from Josh (Alex Hurt), and asks Dante (Morgan Spector) to help her manage her medication levels. Carrie also proposes to Dante a plan to connect Wellington to Simone Martin's dealings, but warns that it is "completely illegal". Dante agrees to collaborate with her.

On television, a news report breaks that J.J. was left to bleed out and die alone at the hospital. A photo is shown: one of the photos taken by the hospital intruder, with the doctors edited out of the image. Agent Maslin (Matt Servitto) sees the report and declares that it is not true, as he had just been in touch with the hospital and learned that J.J. was stable. Saul (Mandy Patinkin) frantically calls O'Keefe (Jake Weber), urging him to relay the truth to the Elkins family, but O'Keefe hesitates. Bo Elkins sees the report on TV. Enraged, he executes Agent Goodman in response. Via the listening device, Maslin hears the gunshot and orders an immediate assault on the compound. A major firefight ensues as O'Keefe hides in the basement. After the battle ends, O'Keefe uneasily walks past the bodies of his fallen allies as he is taken into FBI custody.

== Production ==
The episode was directed by Alex Graves and co-written by executive producers Chip Johannessen and Patrick Harbinson.

== Reception ==
=== Reviews ===
The episode received an approval rating of 89% on the review aggregator Rotten Tomatoes based on 9 reviews.

Scott Von Doviak of The A.V. Club gave the episode an "A−" grade, calling it a "a genuine nail-biter" and adding "Homeland can still deliver the escalating tension and dread exploding into chaos that made it a hit in the first place". Entertainment Weekly's Shirley Li rated the episode a "B+". She thought it was "for the most part... the strongest of the season 7 quartet so far" but did think that Carrie's role was still too minimized.

=== Ratings ===
The original broadcast was watched by 930,000 viewers.
