= Andante (Homeland) =

- Homeland episode
- Episode no.: Season 7 Episode 7
- Directed by: Lesli Linka Glatter
- Written by: Patrick Harbinson; Chip Johannessen
- Production code: 7WAH07
- Original air date: March 25, 2018
- Running time: 54 minutes

Guest appearances
- James D'Arcy as Thomas Anson; Amy Hargreaves as Maggie Mathison; Catherine Curtin as Sandy Langmore; Julee Cerda as Reiko Umon; Fredric Lehne as General Rossen; Mackenzie Astin as Bill Dunn; William Popp as Stein; Clé Bennett as Doxie Marquis; Ari Fliakos as Carter Bennet; Peter Vack as Clint Prower; Courtney Grosbeck as Josie Mathison-Dunn; Tricia Paoluccio as Audrey Navarro; Julian Gamble as federal judge; Beau Bridges as Vice President Ralph Warner

Episode chronology
← Previous "Species Jump"	Next → "Lies, Amplifiers, Fucking Twitter"
- Homeland season 7

"Andante" is the seventh episode of the seventh season of the American television drama series Homeland, and the 79th episode overall. It premiered on Showtime on March 25, 2018.

== Plot ==
Saul (Mandy Patinkin) apprises Wellington (Linus Roache) of the situation with Simone Martin — that she intends to implicate Wellington in the plot to assassinate General McClendon, and that she is in league with Russian interests. A stunned Wellington sends a letter of resignation to President Keane (Elizabeth Marvel). Keane pays a visit to Wellington to inform him that she does not accept his resignation, as he is needed more than ever with her administration under attack.

Carrie (Claire Danes) and her crew leave Dante's apartment with as much evidence as they can collect, though they do not find anything immediately incriminating. The next day, an argument with Maggie (Amy Hargreaves) leads to Carrie taking Franny and moving out; she attempts to book a stay at a motel, but her credit card is declined. Dante (Morgan Spector) offers to let them temporarily stay with him. Carrie snoops around Dante's apartment some more and learns that his ex-wife, Audrey (Tricia Paoluccio), works for the Department of the Treasury.

Carrie tracks down Audrey and poses as FBI, claiming to be doing a background check on Dante for a job. Carrie learns from Audrey that some things Dante had said about his past — having a drinking problem, his wife being bipolar — were lies, and also that he had harbored resentment for "a CIA station chief" in Kabul — Carrie — for being promoted after a botched drone strike while Dante's career struggled. Meanwhile, Dante goes to Maggie's house to search Carrie's room, under the pretense of fetching some of Franny's belongings, and discovers research that Carrie had been compiling on him.

Using his knowledge of Max's surveillance cameras as leverage, Saul forces Max (Maury Sterling) to join his task force, with the stipulation that all findings are to be reported to him, not Carrie. Saul is unable to convince a federal judge via a writ of mandamus to gather information from Simone Martin ahead of her hearing with Senator Paley, and decides to focus on Dante instead when Max discovers that Dante and Simone travelled to five of the same European cities at the same time. That night, Carrie and Dante tease each other with the knowledge that they were spying on one another. As the tense confrontation transitions into sex, they are interrupted when agents charge in and take Dante away in handcuffs on Saul's orders.

== Production ==
The episode was directed by executive producer Lesli Linka Glatter and co-written by executive producers Patrick Harbinson and Chip Johannessen.

== Reception ==
=== Reviews ===
The episode received an approval rating of 78% on the review aggregator Rotten Tomatoes based on 9 reviews.

Scott Von Doviak of The A.V. Club gave the episode a "B" grade, noting that it advanced the season's story arcs significantly, but also that it leaned too much on drama surrounding Carrie's family.

=== Ratings ===
The original broadcast was watched by 1.28 million viewers.
