= America First (Homeland) =

- Homeland episode
- Episode no.: Season 6 Episode 12
- Directed by: Lesli Linka Glatter
- Written by: Alex Gansa; Ron Nyswaner
- Production code: 6WAH12
- Original air date: April 9, 2017
- Running time: 54 minutes

Guest appearances
- Maury Sterling as Max; Hill Harper as Rob Emmons; Jake Weber as Brett O’Keefe; Linus Roache as David Wellington; Robert Knepper as General Jamie McClendon; James Mount as Agent Thoms; Alfredo Narciso as Elian Coto; John Getz as Joe Crocker; Philip Casnoff as Christopher; Marin Hinkle as Christine Lonas; Orlagh Cassidy as Rachel Crofts

Episode chronology
← Previous "R Is for Romeo"	Next → "Enemy of the State"
- Homeland season 6

"America First" is the sixth-season finale of the American television drama series Homeland, and the 72nd episode overall. It premiered on Showtime on April 9, 2017.

== Plot ==
Dar Adal (F. Murray Abraham) is revealed to have had Senator Coto (Alfredo Narciso) kidnapped and handcuffed inside a freezer room. Dar rebukes Coto for cutting him out of the loop and tortures him for information on the conspiracy involving Quinn. Dar also kidnaps Max (Maury Sterling) who had just escaped from the underground troll farm maintained by Brett O’Keefe (Jake Weber). Using Max, Dar finds that Quinn, who does not even use email, has been linked to a radical, alt-right on-line persona.

Carrie (Claire Danes) and Quinn (Rupert Friend) rush to President-elect Keane's (Elizabeth Marvel) headquarters. Keane's staff receives information on a possible bomb in the building. An evacuation is initiated. Dar calls Carrie with the information he got from Coto: the bomb threat is a ruse to get Keane out of the building, where she can be assassinated, while Quinn is to be framed as the killer. Carrie steps in front of the vehicle containing Keane before it leaves. The other two cars in the motorcade are rocked by an explosion as they exit the parking garage. Carrie, Keane, and Agent Thoms (James Mount) retreat back into the building. McClendon's special ops team enters the building; they come across Thoms and execute him while hunting for Keane. Quinn finds Carrie and Keane and loads them into the back of an SUV. He pulls out of the garage and speeds towards the barricade, his path lined by armed soldiers who open fire as he goes by. Quinn gets his passengers to safety but dies from bullet wounds in the process.

Six weeks later, following Keane's inauguration, Keane's administration remains mired in controversy. O'Keefe continues publicly to criticize Keane. In Washington, the President maintains limited contact with the intelligence community, leaving many officials to worry if they face termination, or even arrest.

Carrie has taken a position working under President Keane as a temporary liaison to the intelligence community. At a meeting, intelligence officials bristle at their lack of access to Keane, while Carrie tries to assure them that their jobs are safe. Keane offers Carrie a permanent position as a senior advisor to the President. Carrie is honored but asks for some time to consider the offer.

Saul (Mandy Patinkin) visits Dar who is now in prison. Dar admits that he lost control of the plan he set into motion, but still does not think he was wrong in his intentions as he finds Keane "distinctly un-American".

Back in New York, Carrie goes through Quinn's things, finding an envelope of pictures of Quinn's son John Jr., whom he had never met, and also of Carrie. While moved by the pictures, Carrie gets a frantic call from Saul who is being arrested. She turns on the news to see reports that dozens of incumbent officials from the State Department, the Department of Defense, and the CIA have been arrested due to allegedly being connected to the assassination attempt.

An enraged Carrie tries to see Keane but is not allowed into her office. Keane hears Carrie's pleas that innocent people are being arrested but does nothing as Carrie is escorted out of the building. The episode ends with Carrie looking out at the Capitol Building introspectively, in a manner similar to Nicholas Brody at the end of the pilot.

== Production ==
The episode was directed by executive producer Lesli Linka Glatter and co-written by showrunner Alex Gansa and co-executive producer Ron Nyswaner.

== Reception ==
=== Reviews ===
The episode received a rating of 73% with an average score of 5.76 out of 10 on the review aggregator Rotten Tomatoes with the consensus stating: "'America First' confounds expectations with a shocking development that caps a creative rebound -- and effectively lays the groundwork for Homeland's season 7.".

Brian Tallerico of New York Magazine rated the episode 4 out of 5 stars, saying "The season finale... focused on several of the things this show does best. It was action-packed, which is something we've come to expect from closing chapters of seasons of this show, but it was also foreboding about the future of a paranoid country."

Matt Brennan of Paste had a mixed response for the episode, stating "With reference to the novel in which Quinn hides his few keepsakes, Homeland fails to follow through on the promise of 'A Flash of Light,' which was to offer a form of self-reflection our foreign policy dangerously lacks: Great Expectations, dashed."

Joshua Alston from The A.V. Club was more critical of the episode, giving it a "D+" rating, calling it "a fitting end to its worst season ever."

=== Ratings ===
The original broadcast was watched by 1.9 million viewers. This episode also marked Rupert Friend's last appearance on Homeland.

=== Accolades ===
This episode is nominated for Outstanding Directing for a Drama Series and Outstanding Sound Editing for a Series for the 69th Primetime Emmy Awards. Mandy Patinkin also selected this episode as his submission for Outstanding Supporting Actor in a Drama Series.
