= Standoff (Homeland) =

- Homeland episode
- Episode no.: Season 7 Episode 3
- Directed by: Michael Klick
- Written by: Anya Leta; Ron Nyswaner
- Production code: 7WAH03
- Original air date: February 25, 2018
- Running time: 51 minutes

Guest appearances
- Amy Hargreaves as Maggie Mathison; Sandrine Holt as Simone Martin; Matt Servitto as Agent Maslin; Fredric Lehne as General Rossen; Sakina Jaffrey as Dr. Meyer; Lesli Margherita as Sharon; Kim Sykes; David Maldonado as Bo Elkins; Colton Ryan as J.J. Elkins

Episode chronology
← Previous "Rebel Rebel"	Next → "Like Bad at Things"
- Homeland season 7

"Standoff" is the third episode of the seventh season of the American television drama series Homeland, and the 75th episode overall. It premiered on Showtime on February 25, 2018.

== Plot ==
Carrie (Claire Danes), now convinced that lithium is no longer effective for her bipolar disorder, sees her psychiatrist (Sakina Jaffrey) and gets a prescription for Seroquel. While sleeping from the effects of her first dosage, she is awakened by Dante (Morgan Spector), who has information on the woman in Wellington's house that Carrie inquired about. Dante identifies her as Simone Martin (Sandrine Holt) who, among other things, has romantic ties to Wellington and received a parking ticket close to the federal prison where McClendon was incarcerated on the day he died. Still groggy, Carrie takes some Adderall and goes with Dante to investigate.

Saul (Mandy Patinkin), accompanied by an FBI detail, arrives at the Elkins' compound. Aiming to bring O'Keefe (Jake Weber) into custody peacefully, Saul opens up negotiations. O'Keefe seems resigned to being arrested, until Bo (David Maldonado) offers the possibility of reinforcements. Later on, several vehicles full of armed men storm the scene, fortifying the compound and ending any pretense of negotiations. Armored vehicles arrive as the FBI equips itself for a protracted standoff.

As the situation with O'Keefe deteriorates, Wellington (Linus Roache) reopens an issue that President Keane (Elizabeth Marvel) had previously rejected: an air strike on a weapons convoy en route from Iran to Syria. Keane is insulted at the idea of contravening her stance just to manipulate the news cycle, and again rejects the plan. That night while Keane is sleeping, Wellington calls General Rossen (Fredric Lehne) and lies, saying that Keane has authorized the air strike and to follow through with it.

Carrie and Dante stake out Simone Martin's house. When Simone leaves, Dante follows her while Carrie breaks into the house. Carrie takes photos of various items and copies files from Simone's computer. However, Carrie gets picked up by the police a short while after exiting the house, as someone witnessed her break-in. At the police station, Carrie refuses to cooperate in any way, worried that being booked with any criminal offense will jeopardize her custody of Franny. Eventually, Dante shows up and uses his influence to get Carrie out of there free and clear.

== Production ==
The episode was directed by executive producer Michael Klick and co-written by Anya Leta and executive producer Ron Nyswaner.

== Reception ==
=== Reviews ===
The episode received an approval rating of 70% on the review aggregator Rotten Tomatoes based on 10 reviews. The website's critical consensus is, "Homeland's reintroduction of Carrie Mathison's mental health struggles will strike many viewers as a distracting rehash, but Claire Dane's harrowing performance makes the subplot feel more fresh than redundant."

The Baltimore Sun's Ethan Renner gave the episode a positive review, summarizing "this hour did a nice job in firmly establishing that this is now a show about Carrie, her life, and how she manages to juggle her career with her daughter and her illness." Shirley Li of Entertainment Weekly was more critical, rating the episode a "C+". She praised the Saul and O'Keefe scenes, but stated that "Carrie's downward spiral feels like a plot contrivance to keep her sidelined."

=== Ratings ===
The original broadcast was watched by 1.26 million viewers.
