= Active Measures (Homeland) =

- Homeland episode
- Episode no.: Season 7 Episode 5
- Directed by: Charlotte Sieling
- Written by: Debora Cahn
- Production code: 7WAH05
- Original air date: March 11, 2018
- Running time: 50 minutes

Guest appearances
- James D'Arcy as Thomas Anson; Mark Ivanir as Ivan Krupin; Sandrine Holt as Simone Martin; Chinasa Ogbuagu as Jackie Goodman; Brian O'Neill as FBI Director Stendig; Barbara Rosenblat as Attorney General Hoberman; William Popp as Stein; Clé Bennett as Doxie Marquis; Ari Fliakos as Carter Bennet; Todd Cerveris as Tom

Episode chronology
← Previous "Like Bad at Things"	Next → "Species Jump"
- Homeland season 7

"Active Measures" is the fifth episode of the seventh season of the American television drama series Homeland, and the 77th episode overall. It premiered on Showtime on March 11, 2018.

== Plot ==
There is concern in the government over possible violence surrounding the Lucasville memorial. President Keane (Elizabeth Marvel) makes pleas to the wives of the FBI agents who were killed in Lucasville, asking them to also attend the memorial. The wives are received with hostility by the attendees until Mary Elkins greets them and invites them to sit with her. The evening proceeds without major incident.

After O'Keefe (Jake Weber) insists he had nothing to do with planting the story, Saul (Mandy Patinkin) comes up with a working theory — the fake news story about J.J. Elkins was disseminated by Russia. He visits Ivan Krupin (Mark Ivanir), a former SVR operative now in witness protection. They discuss Yevgeny Gromov, a Russian who sparked conflict in Ukraine with a similarly fabricated story. Krupin says he doubts that the Russians are behind this latest incident. Saul is unsure if he is trustworthy and requests surveillance be placed on Krupin.

With the objective of connecting the McClendon assassination to David Wellington, Carrie (Claire Danes) assembles a team of friends from her CIA days. Along with Dante (Morgan Spector) and Max (Maury Sterling), the team stakes out Simone Martin's (Sandrine Holt) workplace, along with disabling Simone's car so she stays after her co-workers. When only Simone remains inside, three team members go inside to nab Simone and rough her up. Anson (James D'Arcy) gets Simone to confess that she withdrew $50,000 as a payment for the murder of McClendon, and then demands an additional $100,000 and releases her. Fully expecting Simone to immediately report to her handler, the team is gratified when her first phone call is to their prime suspect, Wellington (Linus Roache). Simone's subsequent visit to Wellington's house is caught by Carrie's cameras. Carrie watches the footage and is crestfallen when Simone merely has sex with Wellington, not saying a word about the shakedown.

== Production ==
The episode was directed by Charlotte Sieling and written by co-executive producer Debora Cahn.

== Reception ==
=== Reviews ===
The episode received an approval rating of 80% on the review aggregator Rotten Tomatoes based on 10 reviews. The website's critical consensus is, "'Active Measures' wrings some juicy suspense from an impromptu sting chock full of twists and eerily relevant subtext."

Shirley Li of Entertainment Weekly' rated the episode a "B+", concluding that it "activated several new mysteries to pursue, and this latest twist leaves me intrigued to see more". Brian Tallerico of New York Magazine rated the episode 3 out of 5 stars, and highlighted the conversation between Keane and Goodman as the best scene of the episode.

=== Ratings ===
The original broadcast was watched by 1.32 million viewers.
