= Enemy of the State (Homeland) =

- Homeland episode
- Episode no.: Season 7 Episode 1
- Directed by: Lesli Linka Glatter
- Written by: Debora Cahn; Alex Gansa
- Production code: 7WAH01
- Original air date: February 11, 2018
- Running time: 60 minutes

Guest appearances
- Amy Hargreaves as Maggie Mathison; Robert Knepper as General Jamie McClendon; Dylan Baker as Senator Sam Paley; Ellen Adair as Janet Bayne; Mackenzie Astin as Bill Dunn; Courtney Grosbeck as Josie Mathison-Dunn; Lesli Margherita as Sharon Aldright

Episode chronology
← Previous "America First"	Next → "Rebel Rebel"
- Homeland season 7

"Enemy of the State" is the first episode of the seventh season of the American television drama series Homeland, and the 73rd episode overall. It premiered on Showtime on February 11, 2018.

== Plot ==
Carrie (Claire Danes) and Franny are living in Washington, D.C., with Carrie's sister Maggie (Amy Hargreaves), her husband Bill (Mackenzie Astin), and their teenage daughter Josie (Courtney Grosbeck). Tensions are high in the household as Bill works for President Keane (Elizabeth Marvel), while Carrie and Josie are very vocal opponents of her administration.

At the military tribunal, President Keane advocates for General McClendon (Robert Knepper) to be executed for his role in the conspiracy and assassination attempt. Ultimately, he is sentenced to life in prison. Keane is disgusted with the outcome and orders her chief of staff, David Wellington (Linus Roache), to make it right.

Carrie convinces Senator Paley (Dylan Baker) to talk to Dante Allen (Morgan Spector), a contact of hers from the FBI. Carrie promises that Dante will go on the record with his accounts of misconduct on the part of Keane and her staff. That evening, Dante arrives at the location, but Carrie spots a man who is tailing him. She improvises a new location for the meeting, Maggie's office, though this requires calling Josie to deliver the keys to the office. The meeting quickly falls apart when Dante refuses to testify, which he had never agreed to do in the first place. When she gets home, Carrie is scolded by Maggie and Bill for endangering Josie and Franny. Maggie argues that Carrie's reckless behavior is trending towards mania, though Carrie insists that she has been medicating.

Saul (Mandy Patinkin), still in federal prison, is visited by Wellington. He offers Saul not only a release, but the position of National Security Advisor. Saul says he will only accept on the condition that everyone in the second wave of arrests is released immediately, which Wellington balks at. Meanwhile, Max (Maury Sterling) infiltrates a team which has been dispatched to Wellington's house to do a security sweep. He installs several cameras that enable Carrie to spy on Wellington.

McClendon is strip searched as he is admitted into prison. An officer, who is wearing rubber gloves, searches McClendon’s mouth and grabs his tongue. He then leaves the room, ordering McClendon to get dressed. Moments later, McClendon collapses, starts convulsing, and dies on the spot. The unidentified officer, watching McClendon fall and die via a monitor, carefully takes off the gloves and places them in a plastic bag.

== Production ==
The episode was directed by executive producer Lesli Linka Glatter and co-written by Debora Cahn and showrunner Alex Gansa.

== Reception ==
=== Reviews ===
The episode received an approval rating of 83% on the review aggregator Rotten Tomatoes based on 12 reviews. The website's critical consensus is, "Homeland carries out some necessary table-setting with a patient premiere, effectively illustrating that Carrie Mathison is now 'Enemy of the State'."

Brian Tallerico of New York Magazine rated the episode 4 out of 5 stars, declaring it "a strong season premiere that allows for great work by Claire Danes". IndieWire's Ben Travers noted the "excellent twist ending" and praised Lesli Linka Glatter's direction of the climactic scene.

=== Ratings ===
The original broadcast was watched by 1.22 million viewers, an increase of 140,000 from the previous season's premiere.
