= Lies, Amplifiers, Fucking Twitter =

- Homeland episode
- Episode no.: Season 7 Episode 8
- Directed by: Tucker Gates
- Written by: Patrick Harbinson; Chip Johannessen
- Production code: 7WAH08
- Original air date: April 1, 2018
- Running time: 51 minutes

Guest appearances
- Amy Hargreaves as Maggie Mathison; Dylan Baker as Senator Sam Paley; Costa Ronin as Yevgeny Gromov; Sandrine Holt as Simone Martin; Catherine Curtin as Sandy Langmore; Peter Vack as Clint Prower; Elya Baskin as Viktor; Marina Chello as Russian singer; Jennifer Ferrin as Charlotte; Mackenzie Astin as Bill Dunn

Episode chronology
← Previous "Andante"	Next → "Useful Idiot"
- Homeland season 7

"Lies, Amplifiers, Fucking Twitter" is the eighth episode of the seventh season of the American television drama series Homeland, and the 80th episode overall. It premiered on Showtime on April 1, 2018.

== Plot ==
Carrie (Claire Danes) drops off Franny at school and goes to the secure site where Saul (Mandy Patinkin) is holding Dante (Morgan Spector). Carrie takes a shot at interrogating Dante but does not get him to break. When Dante asks for a lawyer, Carrie has an idea and tells Saul "let's give him one." While this is happening, Franny, still traumatized from the previous night, has to be picked up from school by Maggie (Amy Hargreaves). When Carrie returns home, Maggie says that Carrie's treatment and neglect of Franny is downright abusive. Maggie issues an ultimatum: Carrie must admit herself to a hospital immediately, or Maggie will seek custody of Franny. Carrie argues at first, but then leaves and goes back to the secure site.

President Keane (Elizabeth Marvel) is pressured to resign by Senator Paley (Dylan Baker) due to the impending testimony of Simone Martin (Sandrine Holt). Keane and Wellington (Linus Roache) decide to lean on Russia via their ambassador (Elya Baskin), with the threat that Martin's testimony would be considered a "hostile act" against the United States. Leadership in Russia takes the threat seriously, and Yevgeny Gromov (Costa Ronin) is notified that he needs to prevent Simone's testimony. Yevgeny tracks down the safehouse where Martin is being held, and his men are able to distract the guards and escape with her. Yevgeny and Simone embrace and kiss when they are reunited.

Dante's "lawyer" — in fact a man posing as one, sent by Carrie and Saul — has Dante sign some paperwork and leaves. Dante collapses and shows signs of a heart attack. Seeing ink stains on his hands from uncapping a pen given to him by the lawyer, Dante realizes he was poisoned the same way that McClendon was and tells Carrie the Russians were responsible, also implicating Simone. Carrie and Saul get the evidence they were seeking, and then attempt to save Dante by giving him an antidote. Dante's heart temporarily stops and his survival is left in question, which becomes even more crucial to Saul and Carrie when they learn that Simone has escaped, meaning Dante is their only remaining connection to the Russians.

== Production ==
The episode was directed by Tucker Gates and co-written by executive producers Patrick Harbinson and Chip Johannessen.

== Reception ==
=== Reviews ===
The episode received an approval rating of 90% on the review aggregator Rotten Tomatoes based on 10 reviews. The website's critical consensus is, "Homeland revisits its forte with a high-stakes interrogation, yielding a thrilling installment that enriches the season's political conflict with personal stakes for Carrie Mathison."

Brian Tallerico of New York Magazine rated the episode 5 out of 5 stars, writing "this week’s excellent episode of Homeland amplifies Carrie Mathison’s eternal dilemma — her personal life versus protecting her country — offering riveting new material while also feeling of a piece with the history of the show." The A.V. Club's Scott Von Doviak gave the episode a "B−" grade, marking it down somewhat for having an excess of plot twists.

=== Ratings ===
The original broadcast was watched by 1.22 million viewers.
