= Andre the Butcher =

- Directed by: Philip Cruz
- Written by: Philip Cruz; James Hyde
- Produced by: Philip Cruz; James Hyde; Steven Shea
- Starring: Ron Jeremy; April Billingsley; Maury Sterling
- Cinematography: Jose Zambrano Cassella
- Edited by: Philip Cruz; Andy Palmer
- Music by: Stephen E. Cox; Lee Riley
- Distributed by: THINKFilm
- Release dates: February 1, 2005 (Sundance Film Festival); April 26, 2006 (DVD Premiere)
- Running time: 87 minutes
- Country: United States
- Language: English

Andre the Butcher (also known as Dead Meat) is a 2005 supernatural comedy slasher film written and directed by Philip Cruz. The film stars Ron Jeremy as the title character.

== Plot ==
Four junior college students (James "Jimbo," Cookie, Jasmine, and Kristy) are driving along a deserted road in Florida on their way to a cheerleading competition. As Jimbo drives, Cookie performs fellatio on him while Jasmine secretly watches from the backseat. Distracted, Jimbo swerves and hits a utility pole, damaging the car. While looking for help, they find and enter a vacant house, which is actually home to Andre the Butcher, who is not presently there. Jimbo and Kristy decide to go back to the car and wait for help, while Cookie and Jasmine stay behind. Cookie confronts the closeted Jasmine, and the two engage in lesbian sex.

Meanwhile, escaped convicts Tober and Hoss are seeking refuge. They enter Andre's house and find Cookie and Jasmine having sex. The convicts order them into the living room at gunpoint. While in the living room, Sheriff Cooper comes by and knocks on the door. Hoss orders Jasmine to answer it and get rid of him, threatening to kill Cookie if she does not comply. Sheriff Cooper enters the house, informs her of the escaped convicts, and asks her if she has seen them. As she tries to tell him they are in the house, the Sheriff grabs Jasmine and begins to molest her with his baton. Hoss comes out of hiding and kicks the Sheriff in the stomach, handcuffs him to the fridge, and leaves him there while they all drive away in his patrol car.

Jimbo and Kristy, while waiting by a tree, prepare to make out after Kristy reveals intimate feelings toward him. Andre the Butcher shows up and attacks them. He kills Kristy after luring her away and throws a knife at Jimbo, pinning him to a tree. Jimbo is rescued by Deputy Hollingsworth, who is looking for the escaped convicts, and they both head back to the lodge. As Tober, Hoss, Cookie, and Jasmine are driving away in the Sheriff's car, they encounter Andre on the road, blocking their path. After Tober tries to shoot him, Andre drags him out of the car and kills him. The other three run away and go back to the house. Jimbo also returns with Hollingsworth, who then handcuffs Hoss. Still handcuffed in the kitchen, Sheriff Cooper demands she uncuff him, but Jasmine pleas with her not to. Suddenly, the television set turns on, which shows some of their sins: Kristy overeats, and Sheriff Cooper is corrupt. Andre shows up and murders the Sheriff. Hollingsworth shoots at Andre, who runs away, but later returns and kills Jimbo and Cookie.

While in the basement, Jasmine discovers that Andre is not actually human, but something supernatural. Back in the 1950s, he was an ordinary man, had a wife and daughter, and owned a meat market in town. However, his wife and daughter were both killed in a tragic accident. This drove Andre insane. He began to murder his customers and sell their flesh as meat. The townspeople eventually caught on and lynched him. He was buried in a wooden box in a field near his house. His soul was sent to hell, but the devil elected him as his head recruiter on Earth. His duty was to murder sinners, whose souls would be sent to hell. Because he was never given a proper burial, the only way to destroy his demon form on Earth is to bless his grave, which will allow for redemption.

Hoss, Jasmine, and Hollingsworth flee the house with two jugs of holy water (blessed by Hoss, revealed to be a former priest) to find his grave and bless it. However, Andre pursues them, and while running, the jugs break, spilling all the water. He kills Hollingsworth and stabs both Hoss and Jasmine. With no water and seemingly defeated, they both crawl over to his grave, preparing to die together. Having to urinate, Hoss decides to use his urine in place of water. Too weak to do it himself, he asks Jasmine to pull his penis out and aim for him. He urinates on the grave and blesses the urine, which works as holy water, killing Andre. The movie ends with Hoss and Jasmine apparently surviving, despite being badly wounded.

== Cast ==
- Maury Sterling as Hoss
- Ron Jeremy as Andre the Butcher
- April Billingsley as Jasmine Tyner
- Terry Mross as Sheriff Cooper
- Heather Joy Budner as Cookie
- Justin Capaz as Jimbo
- Faye Canada as Deputy Hollingsworth
- Alan Fessenden as Tober
- Elizabeth Mullins as Kristy
- Gene Nash as Narrator
- Jonas Haggins as Deputy Hadden
- Ben Affan as Spider
- Kevin Campbell as Levi
- Jeff Blake as Half-Cop
- April Renee as Nurse April
- Bill Dixon as Headwound Harry
- LuAndra Whitehurst as Andre's Wife
- Emily Hicks-Clark as Andre's Daughter

== Production ==
The film was shot in Florida over a 12-day period in spring of 2004, with most scenes being shot at a hunting camp in Avon Park, as well as Lakeland locations.

== Release ==
The film debuted as Dead Meat at the Sundance Film Festival on February 1, 2005, and again on April 30 at the Fearless Tales Genre Festival in San Francisco, before its world premiere under that title in Lakeland, Florida on May 1, 2005. The film had DVD release as Andre the Butcher on April 26, 2006. Available with Spanish subtitles, DVD extras include film-maker commentary, a trailer gallery, and a clip of deleted scenes. It had German DVD release on January 14, 2010, as House Of The Butcher 2.

== Critical response ==
Of the film's DVD release, DVD Talk wrote that the box art immediately caught their eye, and then disappointed. "The cover art for this release is completely misleading – what we see is a moody, dark, atmospheric picture of a behemoth of a man wielding a clever and looking pretty intense. It's an unsettling image, a picture of death personified and the quotes on the back of the disc's packaging back this up." While offering that the image promised a disturbing film, it misrepresented the contents which were "actually a slapstick horror comedy, emphasis on comedy, and bad comedy at that." Dread Central offered a similar opinion about the film's packaging and wrote, "The character of Andre the Butcher is a complete joke resembling a poor man's Leatherface. Most of the time it's not even Jeremy playing him." They expanded, "It's a dumb, poorly written, mind-numbingly bad experience that doesn't even begin to tread the type of ground that it was attempting to cover." In their own mixed review, Film Threat wrote, "If you enjoy the intentionally cornball lowbrow of Troma, this trashy treat is right up your manure-slathered alley."

Of the film's 2010 DVD release in Germany as House Of The Butcher 2, TV Kult wrote that the film was a classic old-school slasher that even while lacking proper dubbing from English to German, was enjoyable for being what it was: a lovingly made, low-budget film, simple, straightforward and bloody entertainment.
