= Shalwar Kameez (Homeland) =

- Homeland episode
- Episode no.: Season 4 Episode 3
- Directed by: Lesli Linka Glatter
- Written by: Alexander Cary
- Production code: 4WAH03
- Original air date: October 12, 2014
- Running time: 49 minutes

Guest appearances
- Suraj Sharma as Aayan Ibrahim; Michael O'Keefe as John Redmond; Maury Sterling as Max; Emily Walker as Landlady; Terry Maratos; F. Murray Abraham as Dar Adal

Episode chronology
← Previous "Trylon and Perisphere"	Next → "Iron in the Fire"
- Homeland season 4

"Shalwar Kameez" is the third episode of the fourth season of the American television drama series Homeland, and the 39th episode overall. It premiered on Showtime on October 12, 2014.

== Plot ==
Quinn (Rupert Friend) requests to quit the CIA and is given an interview to assess his state of mind. The conversation turns to the events in Islamabad where Sandy Bachman was killed. Quinn refers to a "choice" he made in regards to Sandy and Carrie who were in the car with him at the time, but doesn't elaborate. When the interviewer asks Quinn whether he and Carrie are romantically involved, Quinn gets angry and walks out of the room.

Carrie (Claire Danes) arrives in Islamabad and learns that the Embassy has been placed on lockdown. Nevertheless, she eludes her security detail as well as ISI surveillance and goes to an alternate base of operations she has established, where her trusted allies Fara (Nazanin Boniadi) and Max (Maury Sterling) are waiting. Their goal is to make contact with Aayan Ibrahim (Suraj Sharma). Fara makes the first attempt, visiting Aayan's school posing as a journalist from London. Aayan refuses to speak to her and leaves immediately. Fara reports back to Carrie that Aayan was "terrified". Carrie notes that if Aayan was silenced by someone, he must have valuable information.

The next day, Carrie feigns an illness in a coffee shop bathroom in order to lure Aayan to help, since he is a medical student. When Aayan enters, Carrie identifies herself as Fara's bureau chief. She tells Aayan that she knows he is in danger, and asks him to tell her his story. Carrie offers him protection as well as the option to continue his studies in England or the US. Aayan doesn't respond one way or the other. Carrie gives him her card as she leaves.

Dar Adal confronts Quinn at his apartment. Eden (Emily Walker) overhears. They later have a fight and she tells Quinn that he does not deserve what has happened to him.

Quinn, tirelessly watching amateur video footage of the melee which resulted in Bachman's death, notices a man in a couple of the videos who is wearing an earpiece. Quinn realizes that the incident was premeditated and phones Carrie with the news. Carrie responds that she needs Quinn in Pakistan more than ever, as there is nobody else she can trust. Quinn reluctantly agrees to go.

== Production ==
The episode was directed by executive producer Lesli Linka Glatter and written by executive producer Alexander Cary. It is named after the Shalwar Kameez dress popular in areas of South Asia.

== Reception ==
=== Critical response ===
Cory Barker of TV.com called it a "measured, propulsive episode that made great use of nearly everyone in the cast" and highlighted Rupert Friend's performance. Sonia Saraiya of The A.V. Club gave the episode an "A−" grade, saying it had her "more intrigued and excited about what happens next on Homeland than anything I’ve seen in the past season and more".

=== Ratings ===
The episode was watched by 1.22 million viewers, decreasing in viewership from the premiere which had 1.61 million viewers.
