= Species Jump =

- Homeland episode
- Episode no.: Season 7 Episode 6
- Directed by: Michael Offer
- Written by: Anya Leta; Ron Nyswaner
- Production code: 7WAH06
- Original air date: March 18, 2018
- Running time: 57 minutes

Guest appearances
- James D'Arcy as Thomas Anson; Dylan Baker as Senator Sam Paley; Mark Ivanir as Ivan Krupin; Costa Ronin as Yevgeny Gromov; Sandrine Holt as Simone Martin; Ellen Adair as Janet Bayne; Catherine Curtin as Sandy Langmore; Peter Vack as Clint Prower; William Popp as Stein; Courtney Grosbeck as Josie Mathison-Dunn; Jennifer Ferrin as Charlotte; Clé Bennett as Doxie Marquis; Ari Fliakos as Carter Bennet

Episode chronology
← Previous "Active Measures"	Next → "Andante"
- Homeland season 7

"Species Jump" is the sixth episode of the seventh season of the American television drama series Homeland, and the 78th episode overall. It premiered on Showtime on March 18, 2018.

== Plot ==
Simone Martin (Sandrine Holt) is served a subpoena to testify in front of Senator Paley's (Dylan Baker) subcommittee. At a proffer session, she is shown evidence of her cash transactions, which was presented to Paley by Dante (Morgan Spector). Martin requests immunity in exchange for naming the person who ordered her to drop off the cash. When it becomes clear that Martin is going to implicate Wellington (Linus Roache), Carrie (Claire Danes) wants to disrupt the proceedings as she believes Wellington to be innocent based on her surveillance. Dante is able to dissuade her. Not knowing how to proceed, Carrie explains the situation to Saul (Mandy Patinkin). As they recount the chain of events, Saul helps Carrie realize that Dante was the originator of the lead on Simone Martin, and that Dante might have been setting Carrie up from the beginning to bring down Wellington.

Saul recruits ex-CIA Russia expert Sandy (Catherine Curtin) and tech guru Clint (Peter Vack) to begin investigating Russia's possible disinformation campaign. When a video of Wellington confronting Simone Martin goes viral, Clint deduces that the video originally came from a network of automated social media accounts —the same ones that disseminated the fake story about the supposed death of J.J. Elkins.

Ivan Krupin (Mark Ivanir) requests a meeting with Yevgeny Gromov (Costa Ronin) where he orders Yevgeny to cease operations that have led to the deaths of American citizens on U.S. soil, a violation of their protocol. Yevgeny dismisses Ivan's concerns as those of an outdated regime. Shortly afterwards, Ivan is drowned by Yevgeny's henchmen. Saul finds his necklace at the scene after receiving Ivan's distress signal.

Carrie organizes a celebration at a local bar, inviting Max (Maury Sterling), Dante, Anson (James D'Arcy), Stein (William Popp), Doxie (Clé Bennett), and Bennet (Ari Fliakos). Carrie seduces Dante and they go back to his apartment. As they kiss, Dante falls unconscious, having been drugged by Carrie. The rest of Carrie's team enters the apartment to search and take photos.

== Production ==
The episode was directed by Michael Offer and co-written by Anya Leta and executive producer Ron Nyswaner.

== Reception ==
=== Reviews ===
The episode received an approval rating of 100% on the review aggregator Rotten Tomatoes based on 10 reviews. The website's critical consensus is, "'Species Jump' doesn't disappoint when it comes to the long-awaited reunion of Carrie and Saul as the season's disparate threads come together to form a tantalizing central conflict."

New York Magazine's Brian Tallerico had very high praise for the episode, rating it 5 out of 5 stars, and calling it "one of its best episodes in years". Tallerico credited "the tight writing and direction" and continued "it’s an episode that plays with what we know about these characters — Carrie’s recklessness and Saul’s brilliance — and reminds us just how ambitious this season has been overall". Scott Von Doviak of The A.V. Club gave the episode a "B+" grade, and commented on the Saul/Carrie scene "their scene this week is critical in that it re-centers Carrie in the narrative with the big reveal about Dante".

=== Ratings ===
The original broadcast was watched by 1.25 million viewers.
