= Iron in the Fire (Homeland) =

- Homeland episode
- Episode no.: Season 4 Episode 4
- Directed by: Michael Offer
- Written by: Patrick Harbinson
- Production code: 4WAH04
- Original air date: October 19, 2014
- Running time: 53 minutes

Guest appearances
- Suraj Sharma as Aayan Ibrahim; Michael O'Keefe as John Redmond; Mark Moses as Dennis Boyd; Maury Sterling as Max; Raza Jaffrey as Aasar Khan; Nimrat Kaur as Tasneem Qureishi; Art Malik as Bunran Latif; Numan Acar as Haissam Haqqani; Shavani Seth as Kiran

Episode chronology
← Previous "Shalwar Kameez"	Next → "About a Boy"
- Homeland season 4

"Iron in the Fire" is the fourth episode of the fourth season of the American television drama series Homeland, and the 40th episode overall. It premiered on Showtime on October 19, 2014.

== Plot ==
Aayan (Suraj Sharma) goes to Kiran's (Shavani Seth) house to retrieve the vials he left there, only to learn that her father not only destroyed the vials but reported Aayan to his university, since her father thought they were stolen property. Aayan visits Carrie (Claire Danes) and accepts her request to be part of her story, in return for continuing his studies in London and 80,000 rupees. Carrie shows him a picture of ISI agent Farhad Ghazi (Tamer Burjaq), the man in one of the YouTube videos, and Aayan confirms that the same man entered his apartment and punched him. Carrie asks what the 80,000 rupees are for, but Aayan refuses to answer. As he leaves, Carrie asks Fara (Nazanin Boniadi) and Max (Maury Sterling) to secretly follow him.

Dennis Boyd, the husband of Ambassador Martha Boyd, is serving as a professor at a nearby university. At the end of a lecture, he is approached by a woman named Tasneem Qureishi (Nimrat Kaur), who states that she knows Dennis stole information from Martha and gave it to Sandy Bachman. She says she wishes to continue the information exchange. Dennis refuses to answer, and arranges to leave the country and go back to George Washington University, his previous workplace. However, a few days later, Tasneem's men assault him and she demands that he stay, or else she will send evidence of Dennis' information theft to the FBI. This will send him to prison for treason and ruin his wife's career.

Quinn (Rupert Friend) breaks into Farhad's house while he is sleeping and clones his cell phone, allowing Carrie's team to hear Farhad's conversations. However, Farhad receives a call about "laundry" and decides to discard the phone and change residences.

Aayan goes to his school's teaching hospital and gives the 80,000 rupees to a young woman, who goes and retrieves a bag for him. Fara watches as Aayan delivers the bag to his uncle Haissam Haqqani, who is revealed to have never died in the drone strike. Carrie decides that Aayan is guilty of aiding and abetting a terrorist, and therefore, she is freed from her promise to send Aayan to a medical school in London, which was unrealistic in the first place.

That night, Aayan returns to the journalists' office that is a front for Carrie's alternate loyal staff. Fara escorts him from there to Carrie's safehouse. Aayan expects to be sent to London right away, and is upset when Carrie responds that getting the passport and visa will take a few days. Aayan informs her that his current university just expelled him. As they prepare Aayan's bed, Carrie attempts to seduce him. Aayan hesitates, but ultimately gives in. They spend the night together.

== Production ==
The episode was directed by Michael Offer and written by co-executive producer Patrick Harbinson.

== Reception ==
=== Critical response ===
TV.com's Cory Barker said the episode was a good illustration of the increased scope of Homeland's storylines in Season 4, but criticized the decision to have Carrie seduce Aayan.

Josh Modell of The A.V. Club gave the episode a "B+" grade, concluding that "the pieces are falling nicely into place for some excellent, twisty spy games".

=== Ratings ===
The episode was watched by 1.35 million viewers, an increase in viewership from the previous episode which had 1.22 million viewers.
