= About a Boy (Homeland) =

- Homeland episode
- Episode no.: Season 4 Episode 5
- Directed by: Charlotte Sieling
- Written by: Meredith Stiehm
- Production code: 4WAH05
- Original air date: October 26, 2014
- Running time: 47 minutes

Guest appearances
- Suraj Sharma as Aayan Ibrahim; Michael O'Keefe as John Redmond; Mark Moses as Dennis Boyd; Raza Jaffrey as Aasar Khan; Nimrat Kaur as Tasneem Qureishi

Episode chronology
← Previous "Iron in the Fire"	Next → "From A to B and Back Again"
- Homeland season 4

"About a Boy" is the fifth episode of the fourth season of the American television drama series Homeland, and the 41st episode overall. It premiered on Showtime on October 26, 2014.

== Plot ==
The morning after they sleep together, Aayan (Suraj Sharma) announces to Carrie (Claire Danes) that he has changed his mind and prepares to leave the safehouse. To get him to stay, Carrie has to warn him that both the CIA and the ISI are actively hunting him. Later that day, Carrie conducts her first interview of Aayan. She delves into Aayan's relationship with his uncle, Haissam Haqqani (Numan Acar). When Carrie floats the rumor that Haqqani is still alive, Aayan gets very disconcerted, maintaining that Haqqani is dead and that he saw the body himself.

En route to the United States, Saul (Mandy Patinkin) sees Farhad Ghazi at Benazir Bhutto International Airport. Following Ghazi into a bathroom, Saul is attacked by two other men and given an injection which renders him unconscious. Saul is taken out of the airport in a wheelchair. Ghazi phones Tasneem Qureishi (Nimrat Kaur), telling her "It is done".

Carrie opens up to Aayan by telling him about her baby. She veils the truth by saying the baby's father was a fellow journalist who was killed when Carrie sent him on an assignment that was too dangerous. The two have sex again that night, during which Aayan notices Carrie starting to cry. Aayan worriedly asks if he is hurting her or doing something wrong, to which she covers her tears with a lie that he just makes her happy.

On a stakeout, Fara (Nazanin Boniadi) and Quinn (Rupert Friend) spot a cleric who had been seen accompanying Haqqani. They follow him to a checkpoint and are unable to go any further. Quinn calls Carrie in order to summon a drone to track the vehicle, but she doesn't answer her phone, causing them to give up the pursuit. A guard at the same checkpoint discovers Saul bound and gagged in the trunk of the cleric's car, but takes no action and just waves them through. Fara and Quinn are unaware that Saul is bundled up in the back of a car just meters ahead of them.

Dennis Boyd (Mark Moses) breaks into Carrie's apartment using a key given to him by Tasneem. He takes photographs of various items, including Carrie's family photos and her medication bottles.

The next morning, Quinn goes to the safehouse. He takes Carrie to task for not answering her phone and tells her about the cleric they lost track of due to her being unreachable. They part on bad terms when Carrie defends herself as having been busy "recruiting", while Quinn responds that it looks more like she was just "fucking a child". Carrie tells a clearly jealous Quinn that it has nothing to do with him anyway. He leaves hurt and angry with Carrie for clearly crossing a line he thinks/believes she should not have. Later, while watching a sunrise off the safehouse's roof garden, Aayan tells Carrie that he no longer wishes to lie to her and finally confesses that his uncle is indeed still alive.

== Production ==
The episode was directed by Charlotte Sieling and written by executive producer Meredith Stiehm.

== Reception ==
=== Critical response ===
Price Peterson of New York magazine rated the episode 4 out of 5 stars, praising the "devastating performances" by Claire Danes and Suraj Sharma.

The A.V. Club's Josh Modell gave the episode a "B−" grade, saying it was a "fine episode" but consisted of "a lot of setup and not much payoff".

Scott Collura of IGN rated the episode 8.6 out of 10, noting that it managed to make Carrie more sympathetic despite her continued deception.

=== Ratings ===
The episode was watched by 1.52 million viewers, an increase in viewership from the previous episode which had 1.35 million viewers.
