= Julee Cerda =

South Korean-born American actress

- 줄리 세르다
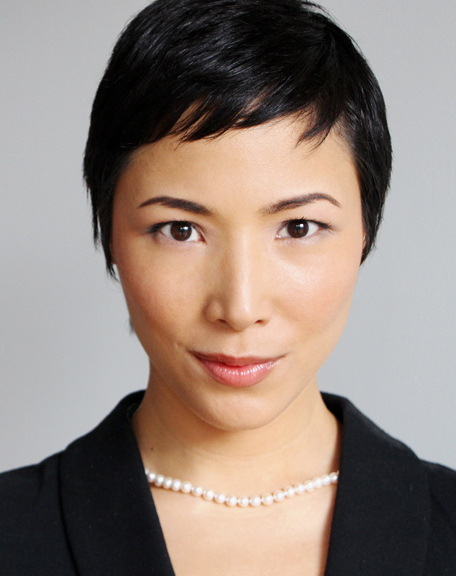
- Cerda in 2014
- Born: South Korea
- Education: Marist College
- Occupation: Actress
- Years active: 2006–present
- Website: juleecerda.com

Julee Cerda (Korean: 줄리 세르다) is a South Korean-born American actress.

== Biography ==
Born in South Korea to a Korean mother and Dominican father, Julee Cerda was raised simultaneously in New York and the Dominican Republic. While in high school, her class took a field trip to see the Broadway production of Les Misérables, and Cerda stated that she was "floored" by the production, and it convinced her to pursue a career in acting. She later attended Marist College and participated in comedy troupes such as Upright Citizens Brigade and Tangana!, the latter of which she was a founding member. She moved on to acting in advertisements but wished to take on wider acting roles. Cerda has been among actors of mixed ethnicity who have found it difficult working in the Hollywood system. "I don't fit 100% into any category. I'm an American, but casting directors don't always see me as that. I'm often looked at as the 'other', but it's getting better because people of color are working to make it better."

Cerda eventually began booking roles in high-profile television productions, such as Homeland, Orange Is the New Black, House of Cards, Nurse Jackie, Iron Fist, and The Mighty Ducks: Game Changers. She also gained recognition for starring in the Broadway productions Children of a Lesser God and Smart People.

== Filmography ==
=== Film ===
List of film appearances, with year, title, and role shown
Year	Title	Role	Notes
2006	Seeking Solace	Courtesan	Short film
2008	Dog Run	Mandee	Short film
2010	Looking for These?	Yasmin	Short film
2013	The Disappearance of Eleanor Rigby	Nurse	Versions: "Them" and "Her"
2013	A Miracle in Spanish Harlem	Dr. Yi	
2015	The Intern	ATF Creative Team	
2015	No Letting Go	Linda	
2015	The Great Gilly Hopkins	Mrs. Hong	
2016	Passengers	Hologram instructor	
2017	Laying Low		Short film
2018	Madeline's Madeline	Carrie	
2020	You're Not Alone	Teacher	
2023	Vacation Friends 2	Mrs. Kim	
2024	Descendants: The Rise of Red	Evil Stepmother	Television film
2026	Solo Mio	Donna	

=== Television ===
List of television appearances, with year, title, and role shown
Year	Title	Role	Notes
2010	12 Steps to Recovery	Belinda	Episode: "Out of Your League"
2011	Nurse Jackie	Waitress	Episode: "Mitten"
2011	White Collar	Teller	Episode: "Taking Account"
2012	Royal Pains	Anesthesiologist	2 episodes
2014	Black Box	Stylist	Episode: "Kodachrome"
2015	Allegiance	FBI agent at field office	Episode: "Pilot"
2015	I Love You...But I Lied	Lori	Episode: "Threesome/Surrogate"
2016	Limitless	Gerd rep	Episode: "Fundamentals of Naked Portraiture"
2016	House of Cards	Dana Treister	Episode: "Chapter 47"
2016	The Family	Doctor	Episode: "I Win"
2016–2019	Blue Bloods	Defense attorney / Wright counsel	2 episodes
2016	Orange Is the New Black	Jazmina	Episode: "Bunny, Skull, Bunny, Skull"
2016	Odd Mom Out		Episode: "Hanoi Jill"
2017	Time After Time	Chase Chandler	Episode: "Out of Time"
2017	Billions	Sam Brandt	Episode: "Currency"
2017–2018	Kevin Can Wait	Kelly	2 episodes
2017–2018	Homeland	Reiko Umon	4 episodes (season 7)
2018	Marvel's Iron Fist	Mika Prada	2 episodes (season 2)
2018	FBI	Gretchen Madison	Episode: "Family Man"
2019	Manifest	Agent Hannah Dayton	Episode: "Hard Landing"
2019	NCIS: New Orleans	Lt. Ella Ford	Episode: "X"
2019	The Loudest Voice	Wendi Deng	Episode: "2008"
2020	Blindspot	Ivy Sands	Recurring role, season 5; 9 episodes
2021	The Mighty Ducks: Game Changers	Stephanie	Main role; 10 episodes
