= Tucker Gates =

American television director and producer

- Occupations: Television director, television producer
- Years active: 1989–present

Tucker Gates is an American television director and producer. He has directed several episodes of the ABC series Alias and Lost. He has also directed episodes of Bates Motel, Weeds, Carnivàle, Point Pleasant, Huff, Boston Legal, Roswell, Brothers & Sisters, Homeland, House of Cards, Ray Donovan, The Office, and Parks and Recreation.

== Selected television credits ==
- The X-Files (1993) TV series
  - episode 3.19 "Hell Money"
  - episode 4.11 "El Mundo Gira"
- Cracker (1997) TV series
  - episode 1.08 "Talk to Me"
- Angel (1999) TV series
  - episode 1.09 "Hero"
- Samantha Who? (2007) TV series
  - episode 1.07 "The Hockey Date"
  - episode 1.09 "The Break Up"
- The Office (2006) TV series
  - episode 3.07 "Branch Closing"
  - episode 3.22 "Women's Appreciation"
  - episode 4.17 "Job Fair"
  - episode 7.17 "Threat Level Midnight"
- CSI: Crime Scene Investigation (2002) TV series
  - episode 3.04 "A Little Murder"
- Alias (2001) TV series
  - episode 5.03 "The Shed"
  - episode 5.09 "The Horizon"
  - episode 5.11 "Maternal Instinct"
  - episode 5.15 "No Hard Feelings"
  - episode 5.17 "All the Time in the World"
- Weeds (2005) TV series
  - episode 1.07 "Higher Education"
  - episode 2.06 "Crush Girl Love Panic"
- Lost (2004) TV series
  - episode 1.08 "Confidence Man"
  - episode 1.17 "…In Translation"
  - episode 1.22 "Born to Run"
  - episode 3.06 "I Do"
  - episode 6.04 "The Substitute"
  - episode 6.09 "Ab Aeterno"
  - episode 6.15 "Across the Sea"
- Carnivàle (2003) TV Series
  - episode 2.06 "The Road To Damascus"
- Point Pleasant (2005) TV series
  - episode 1.01 "Pilot"
- Huff (2004) TV series
  - episode 1.04 "Control"
- Boston Legal (2004) TV series
  - episode 1.06 "Truth Be Told"
- Parks and Recreation (2009) TV series
  - episode 3.04 "Ron & Tammy: Part Two"
  - episode 4.11 "The Comeback Kid"
- Undercovers (2010) TV series
  - episode 1.03 "Devices"
  - episode 1.11 "The Key to It All"
- House (2010) TV series
  - episode 7.07 "A Pox on Our House"
- Homeland (2011) TV series
  - episode 1.08 "Achilles Heel"
  - episode 5.09 "The Litvinov Ruse"
  - episode 6.07 "Imminent Risk"
  - episode 7.08 "Lies, Amplifiers, Fucking Twitter"
  - episode 8.06 "Two Minutes"
- New Girl (2012) TV series
  - episode 1.13 "Valentine's Day"
- Touch (2012) TV series
  - episode 1.04 "Kite Strings"
- Political Animals (2012) TV series
  - episode 1.05 "16 Hours"
- Bates Motel (2013) TV series
  - episode 1.01 "First You Dream, Then You Die"
  - episode 1.02 "Nice Town You Picked, Norma..."
  - episode 1.06 "The Truth"
  - episode 1.09 "Underwater"
  - episode 1.10 "Midnight"
  - episode 2.01 "Gone But Not Forgotten"
  - episode 2.02 "Shadow of a Doubt"
  - episode 2.09 "The Box"
  - episode 2.10 "The Immutable Truth"
  - episode 3.01 "A Death in the Family"
  - episode 3.02 "The Arcanum Club"
  - episode 3.09 "Crazy"
  - episode 3.10 "Unconscious"
  - episode 4.01 "A Danger to Himself and Others"
  - episode 4.10 "Norman"
  - episode 5.01 "Dark Paradise"
  - episode 5.10 "The Cord"
- Ray Donovan (2013) TV series
  - episode 1.10 "Fite Nite"
  - episode 2.01 "Yo Soy Capitan"
  - episode 2.04 "S U C K"
  - episode 3.07 "All Must Be Loved"
  - episode 4.08 "The Texan"
  - episode 5.04 "Sold"
  - episode 6.03 "He Be Tight, He Be Mean"
  - episode 6.04 "Pudge"
  - episode 7.04 "Hispes"
- Brooklyn Nine-Nine (2014) TV series
  - episode 1.18 "The Apartment"
- Tyrant (2014) TV series
  - episode 1.06 "What the World Needs Now"
- House of Cards (2015) TV series
  - episode 3.03 "Chapter 29"
  - episode 3.04 "Chapter 30"
  - episode 4.01 "Chapter 40"
- The Good Place (2016) TV series
  - episode 1.06 "What We Owe To Each Other"
- Patriot (2017) TV series
  - episode 1.06 "The Dynamics Of Flow"
- The Sinner (2017) TV series
  - episode 1.07 "Part VII"
  - episode 1.08 "Part VIII"
  - episode 2.07 "Part VII"
- The Orville (2017) TV series
  - episode 1.07 "Majority Rule"
- Strange Angel (2018) TV series
  - episode 1.03 "Ritual Of The Rival Tribes"
- The Morning Show (2019) TV series
  - episode 1.06 "The Pendulum Swings"
  - episode 2.05 "Ghosts"
  - episode 3.04 "The Green Light"
- Truth Be Told (2019) TV series
  - episode 1.05 "Graveyard Love"
- The Stand (2020) TV series
  - episode 1.02 "Pocket Savior"
- Swimming with Sharks (2022) TV series
  - episode 1.01 "Chapter One"
  - episode 1.02 "Chapter Two"
  - episode 1.03 "Chapter Three"
  - episode 1.04 "Chapter Four"
  - episode 1.05 "Chapter Five"
  - episode 1.06 "Chapter Six"
- The Terminal List (2022) TV series
  - episode 1.05 "Disruption"
- Surface (2022) TV series
  - episode 1.08 "See You on the Other Side"
- American Gigolo (2022) TV series
  - episode 1.03 "Rapture"
- The Diplomat (2023) TV series
  - episode 2.03 "The Ides of March"
  - episode 2.04: "The Other Army"
