= Jake Weber =

English actor (born 1963)

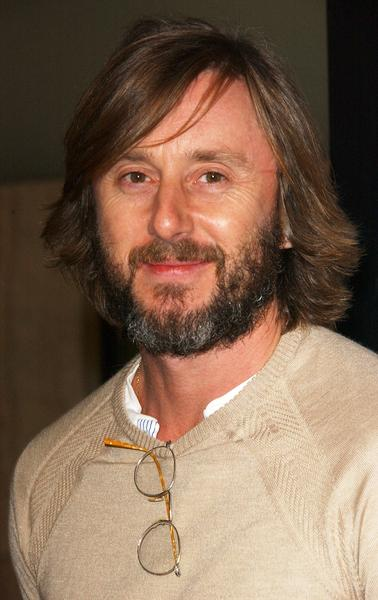
- Weber in 2008
- Born: Jake T. Weber; 12 March 1963 (age 63); London, England
- Education: Middlebury College (BA); Juilliard School (GrDip)
- Occupation: Actor
- Years active: 1989–present
- Spouses: Diana Oreiro (m. 1995; div. 1997) Korri Culbertson (m. 2017)
- Children: 1
- Website: www.jakeweber.com

Jake T. Weber (born 12 March 1963) is an English actor. He is known in film for his role as Michael in Dawn of the Dead and for his role as Drew in Meet Joe Black. On television, he is best known for playing Joe DuBois, the sleep-deprived husband of psychic Allison DuBois, in the popular drama series Medium.

In 2001 and 2002, Weber was a series regular in HBO's The Mind of the Married Man and made guest appearances on Law & Order: Criminal Intent and NYPD Blue. After a recurring role on Fox's The Following, Weber has had series regular roles on Hell on Wheels, NCIS: Hawaii, and Homeland.

== Early life ==
Weber was born in London, England, to Susan Ann Caroline (née Coriat), a British socialite born at Englemere in Berkshire, England on December 3, 1943, and Thomas Evelyn "Tommy" Weber (originally Thomas Ejnar Arkner), born in Denmark December 1, 1938, of Danish and English descent. He also came from a wealthy family. Weber's maternal grandfather, Robert Coriat, who was born in Mogador, Morocco, was of Sephardic Jewish (Moroccan-Jewish) descent. Weber's maternal grandmother, Priscilla Weigall, was English, from an upper-class family. Priscilla's father was Sir William Ernest George Archibald Weigall, 1st Baronet, while Priscilla's maternal grandfather was Sir John Blundell Maple, 1st Baronet. Weber has one sibling, a brother Charley.

Thomas became a racing driver and the couple soon became a fixture of the 1960s British swinging social scene. Their dramatic, fast-paced lives and experiences during that era are detailed in the biography, "A Day in the Life: "One Family, the Beautiful People and the End of the Sixties," by Robert Greenfield.

Weber attended Summerhill School, Leiston, Suffolk. Later, he went to the United States to study at Middlebury College in Vermont, where he sang a cappella with the Dissipated Eight and majored in English literature and political science, graduating with a B.A. cum laude in 1986. He attended The Juilliard School's Drama Division as a member of Group 19 (1986–1990), which also included Laura Linney and Jeanne Tripplehorn. He also studied at Russia's famed Moscow Art Theatre.

During Weber's childhood, his mother, Susan, was diagnosed with depression and LSD-induced schizophrenia. She died from a drug overdose at the age of 27 in June, 1971, when Weber was eight years old. His father, Thomas, sold various illegal drugs to numerous international destinations, primarily for celebrities and other high-powered, wealthy people. He also utilized both of his sons in drug trafficking and preparation.

In 1971, Weber's father took him and his brother to stay for a period at Villa Nellcôte, where the Rolling Stones were recording Exile on Main St. In a 2010 article for The Times, Weber recalled that his "father used him as a drug mule to bring cocaine out for Mick and Bianca Jagger's wedding," which occurred on May 12, 1971, in Saint-Tropez, France.

At the 2010 Cannes film festival, as part of the Directors' Fortnight at the launching of the rock 'n roll documentary, Stones in Exile, Stones front man, Mick Jagger, spoke to the crowd about the months of drug-fuelled recording sessions that produced the Stones' classic 1972 album Exile on Main Street. Jagger joked about the rarely seen original footage in the movie showing eight-year-old Weber rolling marijuana joints for them.

Like his mother, Weber's father struggled with substance addiction until his death in 2006 at age 67.

== Career ==
Weber's roles were often bit parts in A-list films, beginning with that of Kyra Sedgwick's character's unnamed boyfriend in the Oliver Stone-directed period saga Born on the Fourth of July (1989) and continuing with work for such directors as Sidney Lumet (A Stranger Among Us, 1992), Alan J. Pakula (The Pelican Brief, 1993) and Martin Brest (Meet Joe Black, 1998).

He scored one of his premier leads as Dr. Matt Crower, a kindly physician who takes charge of a young boy and protects him from a possessed sheriff in actor-turned-producer Shaun Cassidy's short-lived, but well received, supernatural drama series American Gothic (1995) on CBS. That programme did not last long; and neither did the Mike Binder sitcom The Mind of the Married Man (2001), in which Weber played one of the leads, Chicago newspaper employee Jake Berman.

After his prominent role in the 2004 remake of horror film Dawn of the Dead, Weber played Joe Dubois on Medium, the sleep-deprived husband of Allison Dubois (Patricia Arquette), a psychic intermediary who has visions that help her prevent or solve crimes. In 2016, Weber played a recurring guest-star role as the psychotherapist husband of Detective Andrea Cornell (played by series lead Juliette Lewis) on the second season of the ABC murder mystery, Secrets and Lies. The series was picked up for a full second season by ABC after a successful limited run last spring as a midseason replacement. Weber had a recurring part on the Fox series, The Following, and improvised on the Netflix series Easy. Weber also appeared in seasons 6 and 7 of the Showtime series Homeland.

Weber was cast in the 2021 film Those Who Wish Me Dead. He has performed on Broadway and off-Broadway as well.

== Personal life ==
Weber was married to Diana Oreiro from 1995 to 1997. In 2017, Weber married his longtime girlfriend, Korri Culbertson. Weber has a son, Waylon, from a previous relationship.

== Filmography ==
=== Film ===
Year	Title	Role	Notes
1989	Born on the Fourth of July	Donna's Boyfriend	
1991	Bed & Breakfast	Bobby	
1992	A Stranger Among Us	Yaakov Klausman	
1993	Skin Art	Richard	
1993	The Pelican Brief	Curtis Morgan	
1994	Cultivating Charlie	Charles Thundertrunk	
1994	Vanishing Son II	Bo	Television movie
1994	Vanishing Son IV	Bo	Television movie
1997	What the Deaf Man Heard	Tolliver Tynan	
1997	Amistad	Mr. Wright	
1998	Dangerous Beauty	King Henry	
1998	Into My Heart	Adam	
1998	Meet Joe Black	Drew	
1999	Pushing Tin	Barry Plotkin	
1999	In Too Deep	Daniel Connelly	
1999	Cherry	Dr. Beverly Kirk	
2000	U-571	Lieutenant Michael Hirsch, USNR	
2000	The Cell	FBI Special Agent Gordon Ramsey	
2001	Wendigo	George	
2002	Love Thy Neighbor	Man In Adult Section	
2002	Leo	Ben Bloom	
2002	100 Mile Rule	Bobby Davis	
2004	The Warrior Class	Phil Anwar	
2004	Dawn of the Dead	Michael Shaunessy	
2004	Haven	Officer Powell	
2008	The Haunting of Molly Hartley	Robert Hartley	
2012	Chained	Brad Fittler	
2013	Redemption Trail	John Stubbs	
2013	White House Down	Secret Service Agent Ted Hope	
2014	Hungry Hearts	Dr. Bill	
2014	Learning to Drive	Ted	
2017	Wetlands	Sergeant McCulvey	
2017	Thank You for Your Service	Colonel Plymouth	
2019	The Beach House	Mitch	
2019	Midway	Rear Admiral Raymond Spruance	
2021	Those Who Wish Me Dead	Owen Casserly	
2021	Every Last One of Them	Nichols	
2024	Peter Five Eight	Mr. Lock	
2025	Self-Help	Curtis	

=== Television ===
Year	Title	Role	Notes
1990	Law & Order	Wesley Parker	Episode 8: "Poison Ivy"
1994–1995	Something Wilder	Richie Wainwright	15 episodes
1995–1996	American Gothic	Dr. Matt Crower	15 episodes
1996	NYPD Blue	Bill Walsh	Episode: "Girl Talk"
1997	Liberty! The American Revolution	Virginia Officer	5 episodes
2001	The $treet	Peter Dearborn	2 episodes
2001–2002	The Mind of the Married Man	Jake Berman	20 episodes
2001	Law & Order: Criminal Intent	Carl Atwood	Episode: "One"
2005–2011	Medium	Joe Dubois	130 episodes Nominated—Satellite Award for Best Actor – Television Series Drama
2011	Human Target	Bill Fickner	Episode: "Marshal Pucci"
2012	Royal Pains	Gabe Gleason	Episode: "Bottoms Up"
2012	House	Joe Reese	Episode: "Man of the House"
2013	Elementary	Geoffrey Silver	Episode: "Dirty Laundry"
2014	The Following	Micah	3 episodes
2014, 2016	Hell on Wheels	John Allen Campbell	15 episodes
2015	Tyrant	Jimmy Timmons	8 episodes
2015	The Blacklist	Raymond Reddington/Gregory Devry	1 episode
2016	Easy	Wally	1 episode
2016	Secrets and Lies	Ethan	3 episodes
2017–2018	Homeland	Brett O'Keefe	Recurring Season 6, Starring Season 7
2018–2019	13 Reasons Why	Barry Walker	Recurring role (Season 2–3)
2020	Star Trek: Discovery	Zareh	Guest role (Season 3)
2022	Law & Order: Special Victims Unit	Bob Flynn	Episode: "Video Killed The Radio Star"
2023	NCIS: Hawaiʻi	Jim Carter	Season 2
2024	Blue Bloods	Investigator Christopher Granger	Season 14 Episode 12: "Without Fear or Favor"
