= Amy Hargreaves =

American actress (born 1970)

- Born: January 27, 1970 (age 56); Rockville Centre, New York, U.S.
- Occupation: Actress
- Years active: 1992–present
- Spouse: Renaud Selmès (m. 1999; div. 2007)
- Children: 2

Amy Hargreaves (born January 27, 1970) is an American actress who has worked in film, television, video games and theater. She had a recurring role on Homeland as Maggie Mathison. In 1994, she starred in Brainscan with Edward Furlong. In 2012, she made an appearance as Dr. Karen Folson in the 2nd-season episode "Leap of Faith" on the CBS show Blue Bloods. In 2017, she began portraying the role of Lainie Jensen, mother of protagonist Clay Jensen, in the Netflix series 13 Reasons Why.

== Filmography ==
=== Film ===
Year	Title	Role	Notes
1994	Brainscan	Kimberly	
1995	Tilt-A-Whirl		
1995	Ride for Your Life		Short film
1998	Somewhere in the City		
2000	Growing Down in Brooklyn	Linda	
2006	Delirious	Nikki Blake	
2007	Michael Clayton	Interviewer	
2008	El camino	Sissy	
2009	Against the Current	Sarah Kane	
2009	Offspring	Amy Halbard	
2009	When the Evening Comes	Nikki Blake	
2011	Shame	Hotel Lover	
2011	Alan Smithee	Mrs. Smithee	Short film
2013	Blue Ruin	Sam	
2013	Lawn Care	Nina	
2015	Prism	Donna	
2015	How He Fell in Love	Ellen	
2015	The Happily Ever After		Short film
2015	The Preppie Connection	Ingrid	
2017	Super Dark Times	Karen	
2017	Wonderstruck	Aunt Jenny	
2018	Unintended	Molly	
2019	Buck Run	Karen Templeton	
2019	Sister Aimee	Sister Semple	
2020	Paint	Leslie Pierson	
2021	Sometime Other Than Now	Maureen	
2023	Founders Day	Blair Gladwell	
2023	Hayseed	Jane Fulcher	
2025	Self-Help	Rebecca	

=== Television ===
Year	Title	Role	Notes
1992	Lifestories: Families in Crisis	Cindy	Episode: "The Secret Life of Mary Margaret: Portrait of a Bulimic"
1994	ABC Afterschool Special	Christine	Episode: "Magical Make-Over"
1996	Matt Waters	Chloe Drescher	6 episodes
1998	Saint Maybe	Adult Daphne	TV movie
1999	Cracker: Mind Over Murder	Cathy	Episode: "The Club"
1999	Family Law	Anita Candella	Episode: "Four Drops of Blood"
2002	Law & Order: Criminal Intent	Karyn Milner	Episode: "Tuxedo Hill"
2002–2003	Third Watch	Haley Sundstrom	2 episodes
2003	Little Bill	Isabel (voice)	Episode: "The New Babysitter/My Friend Isabel"
2003–2019	Law & Order: Special Victims Unit	Jane Wellesley / Iris Petersen / Dr. Alexis Hanover	5 episodes
2006	Law & Order	Dana Wechsler	Episode: "Home Sweet"
2009	The Unusuals	Madeline Reed	Episode: "The Tape Delay"
2009	Mercy	Karen	Episode: "Some of Us Have Been to the Desert"
2011–2020	Homeland	Maggie Mathison	20 episodes
2012	Person of Interest	Leslie Powell	Episode: "Root Cause"
2012	Blue Bloods	Dr. Karen Folson	Episode: "Leap of Faith"
2013	The Carrie Diaries	Gail	Episode: "Dangerous Territory"
2013	The Following	DeeDee	Episode: "Love Hurts"
2013	The Blacklist	Anne Forrester	Episode: "Frederick Barnes (No. 47)"
2015	Elementary	Jill Horowitz	Episode: "Hemlock"
2015	The Mysteries of Laura	Nancy Santamaria	Episode: "The Mystery of the Sunken Sailor"
2015	Power	Cindy Chambers	Episode: "Like We're Any Other Couple"
2015–2016	Blindspot	Olivia Delidio	2 episodes
2017–2020	13 Reasons Why	Lainie Jensen	Main Cast; 41 episodes
2021	Bull	Kathleen Peterson	Episode: "The Boy Who Cried Murder"

=== Video games ===
Year	Title	Role	Notes
1995	Ride for Your Life	Unknown Name (voice)	Short
