= Elizabeth Marvel =

American actress

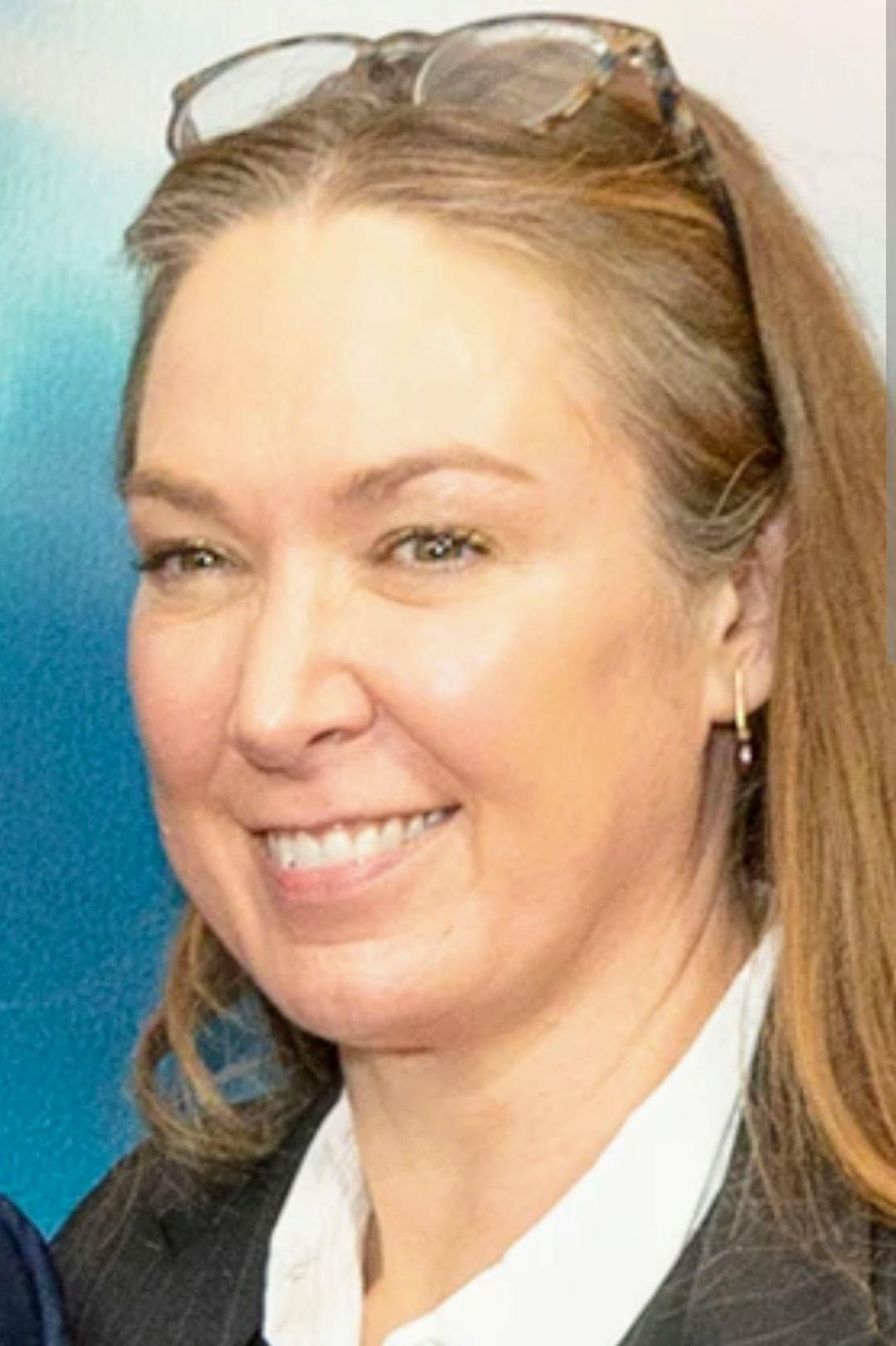
- Born: November 27, 1969 (age 56); Los Angeles, California, U.S.
- Education: Juilliard School (BFA)
- Occupation: Actress
- Years active: 1992–present
- Spouse: Bill Camp (m. 2004)
- Children: 1
- Awards: Obie Awards (1998, 2000, and 2005)

Elizabeth Marvel (born November 27, 1969) is an American actress. Her more prominent roles include Det. Nancy Parras on The District, Solicitor General Heather Dunbar on House of Cards, and President Elizabeth Keane on Homeland. Film roles include Burn After Reading, Synecdoche, New York, True Grit, Lincoln (alongside husband Bill Camp), The Meyerowitz Stories, and Disclosure Day. She also had a recurring role in season 2 of the FX series Fargo and the Netflix miniseries Unbelievable. She also played "The Major" in the series Manifest, and has recurred as defense attorney Rita Calhoun on multiple episodes of Law & Order: Special Victims Unit between 2012 and 2025.

== Early life and education ==
Marvel was born in Los Angeles, California, and was raised in Mohnton, Pennsylvania. She trained at the Interlochen Arts Academy, and then the Juilliard School.

== Career ==
Since the early 1990s she has appeared in off-Broadway plays.

Marvel appeared in many stage productions throughout her career. Her first professional role was as Isabella in Measure for Measure at Canada's Stratford Festival in 1992. She has won Obie Awards for her work in Thérèse Raquin and Misalliance (1998), A Streetcar Named Desire (2000) and Hedda Gabler (2005). She returned to the role she originated Off-Broadway of Brooke Wyeth in Other Desert Cities, which was played by Rachel Griffiths in its Broadway premiere. In 2009, for her performance in Fifty Words, she was nominated for a Drama Desk Award for Outstanding Actress in a Play.

Marvel first gained widespread attention on television, with her four seasons playing the regular role of Nancy Parras in the CBS series The District (2000–04). She played a variety of guest and recurring roles on Lights Out, Law & Order: Special Victims Unit, Nurse Jackie, Person of Interest, 30 Rock, The Good Wife, and The Newsroom.

In film, Marvel has appeared in Burn After Reading (2008), directed by the Coen brothers, and in True Grit (2010), as the adult Mattie Ross. She appeared in The Bourne Legacy (2012), Lincoln (2012), and Hyde Park on Hudson (2012).

In 2009 she played Louisa May Alcott in scenes from the writer's life in the documentary profile "Louisa May Alcott: The Woman Behind 'Little Women'" that aired on the PBS series American Masters.

In 2013, she was cast as lead in the CW family drama pilot Blink, opposite John Benjamin Hickey. She was noted for portraying Heather Dunbar in Netflix's political drama House of Cards. In 2016, she was cast as President-elect Elizabeth Keane for the sixth and seventh seasons of Showtime drama series Homeland.

== Personal life ==
Marvel married actor Bill Camp on September 4, 2004. The couple have one child, a son born in 2007. Marvel revealed on Live with Kelly and Ryan on October 16, 2020, that she has been living with her family on a farm in Vermont.

== Theatre ==
Year	Title	Role	Theater	Notes
1992	The Seagull	Understudy - Masha	Broadway - Lyceum	
1993	Saint Joan	Duchesse de la Tremoulle, Understudy - Joan	Broadway - Lyceum	
1996	Taking Sides	Emmi Straube	Broadway - Brooks Atkinson	
1997	An American Daughter	Quincy Quince	Broadway - Cort	
2000	Lydie Breeze	Lydie Breeze	Broadway - New York Theatre Workshop	
2005	Seascape	Sarah	Broadway - Booth	
2008	Top Girls	Marlene	Broadway - Biltmore	
2012	Other Desert Cities	Brooke Wyeth	Broadway - Booth	Replacement
2013	Picnic	Rosemary Sydney	Broadway - American Airlines	
2019	King Lear	Goneril	Broadway - Cort	
2022	Long Day's Journey into Night	Mary Tyrone	Off-Broadway - Minetta Lane Theatre	
2023	Sabbath's Theater	Drenka, and others	Off-Broadway - The Pershing Square Signature Center	
2025	Five Models in Ruins, 1981	Roberta	Off-Broadway - Lincoln Center	
2026	The Dinosaurs	Joan	Off-Broadway - Playwrights Horizons	

== Filmography ==
=== Film ===
Year	Title	Role	Notes
2000	Ten Hundred Kings	Caroline Shepard	
2005	The Dying Gaul	Kelli Cartonis	
2008	The Guitar	Ma Wilder	
2008	Pretty Bird	Tonya Honeycutt	
2008	Synecdoche, New York	Warehouse Realtor	
2008	Burn After Reading	Sandy Pfarrer	
2009	A Dog Year	Margo	
2009	The Other Woman	Pia	aka Love and Other Impossible Pursuits (UK title)
2010	Holy Rollers	Elka Gold	
2010	Goldstar, Ohio	Edie Deyarmin	Short film
2010	True Grit	40-year-old Mattie Ross	Narrator
2011	Somewhere Tonight	Martha	
2012	The Bourne Legacy	Dr. Connie Dowd	
2012	Hyde Park on Hudson	Missy	
2012	Living in the Age of Surveillance	Alicia Corwin	
2012	Lincoln	Mrs. Jolly	
2014	A Most Violent Year	Mrs. Rose	
2015	Aloha	Natalie	
2015	Consumed	Connie Conway	
2015	Peacock Killer	Sheriff	Short film
2016	Happy Baby	Theo's Mom	
2016	The Congressman	Rae Blanchard	
2016	The Phenom	June Epland	
2017	Easy Living	Abby	
2017	Gifted	Gloria Davis	
2017	The Meyerowitz Stories	Jean	
2018	The Land of Steady Habits	Sophie Ashford	
2019	Native Son	Mrs. Dalton	
2019	Swallow	Katherine Conrad	
2019	Dark Waters	Dr. Karen Frank (voice)	
2019	All the Little Things We Kill	Deb Anderson	
2020	News of the World	Ella Gannett	
2020	Being Dead	Celice Adkins	
2021	With/In: Volume 2		Segment: "In the Air"; also director and writer
2023	The Color Purple	Miss Millie	
2025	G20	Joanna Worth	
2026	Run Amok	Nancy	
2026	Disclosure Day	Sister Maura	
2026	The Life and Deaths of Wilson Shedd	TBA	
TBA	Devoted	TBA	Post-production
TBA	Preppy	TBA	Filming

=== Television ===
Year	Title	Role	Notes
1997	As the World Turns	Photographer	Episode: "#1.10590"
1998	Homicide: Life on the Street	Amy Marshall	Episode: "Abduction"
1998	A Will of Their Own	Diana	Episode: "#1.1"
1999	New York Undercover	Eve Flemming	Episode: "Catharsis"
2000–2004	The District	Officer / Det. Nancy Parras	88 episodes
2001	Law & Order: Criminal Intent	Sylvia Moon	Episode: "Art"
2005	Law & Order: Criminal Intent	Jenny Hendry	Episode: "Prisoner"
2007	Kidnapped	Madeleine	2 episodes
2008–2009	Law & Order	Defense Attorney Grubman	2 episodes
2009	30 Rock	Emily	Episode: "Jackie Jormp-Jomp"
2009	The Good Wife	Lauren Chatham	Episode: "Home"
2009	American Masters	Louisa May Alcott	Episode: "Louisa May Alcott: The Woman Behind 'Little Women'"
2009–2010	Nurse Jackie	Ginny Flynn	3 episodes
2010	Law & Order: Special Victims Unit	Dr. Frantz	Episode: "Savior"
2010	Past Life	Lynn Sampels	2 episodes
2011	Lights Out	Margaret Leary	9 episodes
2012	The Newsroom	Sharon	Episode: "We Just Decided To"
2012–2015	Person of Interest	Alicia Corwin	7 episodes
2012–2025	Law & Order: Special Victims Unit	Defense Attorney Rita Calhoun	15 episodes
2013	King & Maxwell	Kelly Nelson	Episode: "Pilot"
2013	Betrayal	Janet	Episode: "...Nice Photos"
2013	Blink	Helen Trask	Unsold TV pilot
2013	White Collar	Dr. Mara Summers	Episode: "Controlling Interest"
2013	Elementary	Cassandra Walker	Episode: "Tremors"
2014–2016	House of Cards	Heather Dunbar	23 episodes
2015	Fargo	Constance Heck	5 episodes
2017–2018	Homeland	President Elizabeth Keane	24 episodes
2019	Unbelievable	Judith	4 episodes
2019–2020	Manifest	Kathryn Fitz / The Major	8 episodes
2020	Helstrom	Victoria Helstrom / Kthara	10 episodes
2022	The Dropout	Noel Holmes	6 episodes
2023	Mrs. Davis	Celeste Abbot	5 episodes
2023	Love & Death	Jackie Ponder	4 episodes
2024	Presumed Innocent	Lorraine Horgan	6 episodes
2024–2026	Law & Order	Defense Attorney Rita Calhoun	2 episodes
2026	The Gilded Age	Virginia Saville	

== Awards and nominations ==
Year	Association	Category	Nominated work	Result
2009	Drama Desk Awards	Outstanding Actress in a Play	Fifty Words	Nominated
2016	Screen Actors Guild Awards	Outstanding Performance by an Ensemble in a Drama Series	House of Cards	Nominated
2018	Gracie Awards	Best Supporting Actress in a Drama Series	Homeland	Won
2021	Critics' Choice Super Awards	Best Actress in a Superhero Series	Helstrom	Nominated
