= Maury Sterling =

American actor

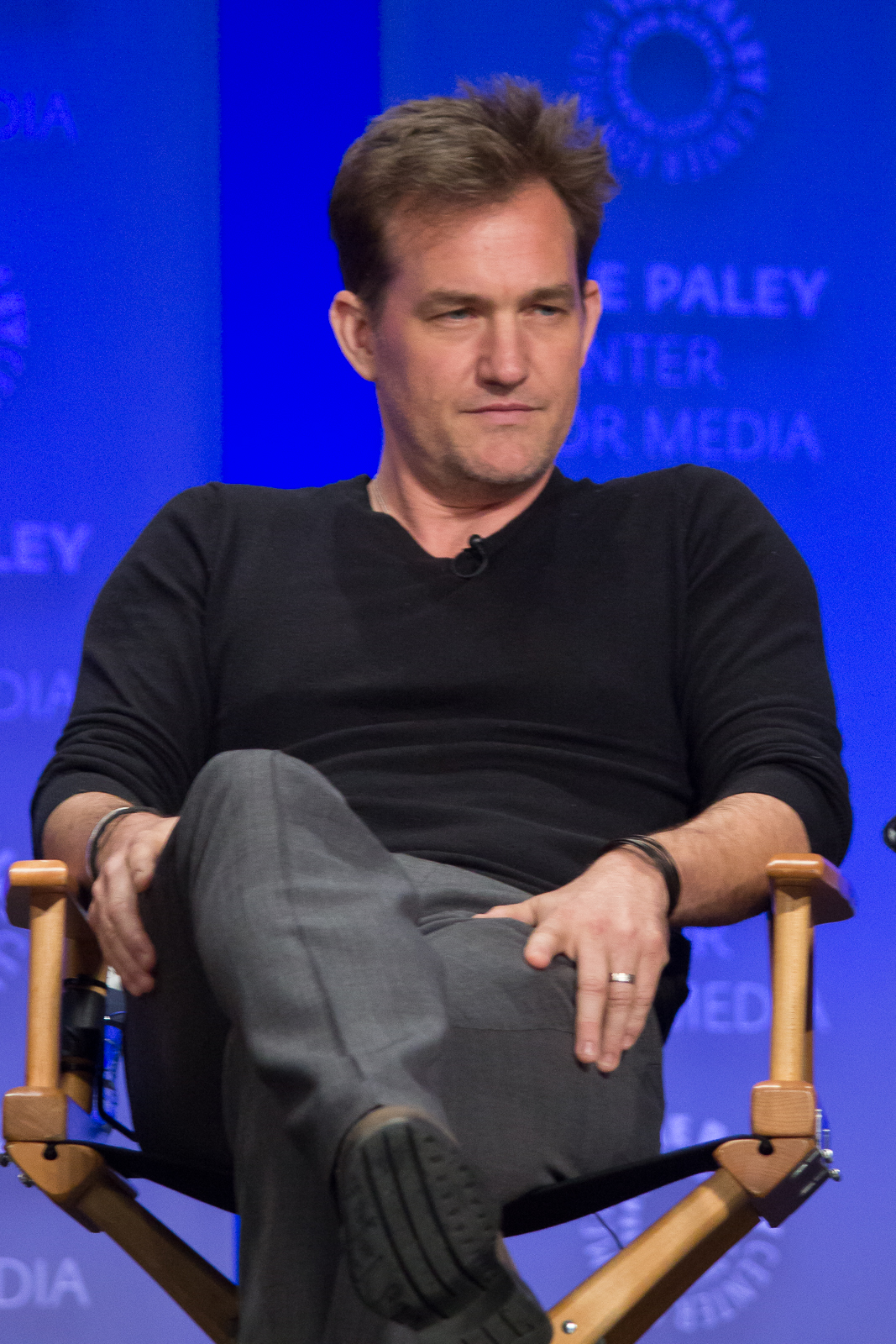
- Sterling at the 2015 PaleyFest
- Born: Charles Maury Wallace Sterling; September 1, 1971 (age 55); Mill Valley, California, U.S.
- Education: University of California, Los Angeles (BA)
- Occupation: Actor
- Spouse: Alexis Boozer (m. 2014)
- Children: 1

Charles Maury Wallace Sterling (born September 1, 1971) is an American actor. He is known for playing Max Piotrowski in Homeland, Rafferty in the comedy film Beverly Hills Chihuahua, and Lester Tremor in the action film Smokin' Aces.

== Early life and education ==
Sterling was born in Mill Valley, California, and started acting in theater productions at age 7. After graduating from San Francisco University High School, he graduated from UCLA where he was educated in its Theater Department. After graduation, he co-founded the nonprofit Buffalo Nights Theater Company.

== Career ==
Sterling has guest starred on numerous television series, including Judging Amy, ER, Star Trek: Enterprise, 24 and CSI: Crime Scene Investigation to name a few. His only TV series regular was in the sitcom Alright Already, which lasted only one season from 1997 to 1998. It originally aired on the now-defunct WB Television Network.

Sterling has appeared in a number of films, mostly in supporting roles. His prominent role came in the 2006 action film Smokin' Aces where he played Lester Tremor of the psychotic neo-Nazi Tremor Brothers (alongside Chris Pine and Kevin Durand). His role required shaving his head, and shaving his eyebrows off. His other prominent role was in Beverly Hills Chihuahua (2008) as the antagonist Rafferty.

In January 2023, Sterling and his wife co-founded a production company, Little Idea Media, that, among other projects, created the story for the film My Dead Friend Zoe that won several Woodstock Film Festival awards and an Audience Award at South by Southwest (SXSW).

== Personal life ==
Sterling and actress Alexis Boozer were married in 2014 and they have a son.

== Filmography ==
=== Film ===
Year	Title	Role	Notes
1995	Outbreak	Sandman One Pilot	
1996	Full Moon Rising	Van Jaspers	
1996	Bulletproof	Skinny Guy	
1996	Somebody is Waiting	Man In Cell	
1997	Columbo: A Trace of Murder	Store Clerk	Made-for-TV film
1997	Behind Enemy Lines	Donny	
2001	Imposter	Comms Tech	
2002	Hart's War	Private First Class Dennis A. Gerber	
2002	March 1st	Maury	Short film
2003	Frankie and Johnny are Married	Roger	
2004	The Old Man and the Studio	Paul	Short film
2004	Illusion	Grant	
2005	Andre the Butcher	Hoss	
2005	Short Fuse	Sam	
2005	Come as You Are	Craig	
2006	Smokin' Aces	Lester Tremor	
2007	The Frolic	John Doe	Short film
2007	Leo	Agent	Short film
2007	Stars	'Moe'	Short film
2008	Depth Charge	Allenson	
2008	Fractalus	Corey	
2008	Beverly Hills Chihuahua	Rafferty	
2010	The A-Team	Gammons	
2010	Smokin' Aces 2: Assassins' Ball	Lester Tremor	
2011	Kung Fu Panda 2	Wolf Soldier #3	Voice
2012	Longmire	Cyrus Brooks	
2013	Coherence	Kevin	
2016	Batman: The Killing Joke	Paris Franz	Voice
2019	Batman: Hush	Thomas Elliot	Voice
2024	Blood and Water	Trav	Short film

=== Television ===
Year	Title	Role	Notes
1995	Picket Fences		
1996	Boy Meets World	Eddie Hunter	
1996	Boston Common	Morgan	
1996	Townies	Doug	
1996	Dark Skies	Mark Waring	
1996	The Single Guy	Mordecai	
1996	Diagnosis Murder	Martin Donner Kingston	
1997	The Pretender	Donny Beaulieu	
1997 - 1998	Alright Already	Vaughn Lerner	Series regular
1998	Touched by an Angel	Eddie Williams	
1998	Two of a Kind	Policeman	
1999	JAG	Petty Officer Simpkins	
1999	G vs E	Harlowe	
1999	Angel	Barney	Episode: "Parting Gifts"
2000	V.I.P.		
2002	Do Over	Mr. Adams	
2002 - 2003	Judging Amy	Paul Zimberg (2002); Spencer Carls (2003)	1 episode each
2003 - 2008	CSI: Crime Scene Investigation	Anders Molyneaux (2003); Detective Ken Martz (2008)	1 episode each
2003	Crossing Jordan	Scott Marshall	
2003	Star Trek: Enterprise	Tarquin	Episode: "Exile"
2004	Without a Trace	Glenn Remick	
2004	Six Feet Under	Pot Dealer	
2004	Nip/Tuck	Ron	
2004	Charmed	Lord Dyson	Episode: "The Bare Witch Project"
2004	Monk	Lewis	
2004 - 2006	ER	Dr. Nelson	5 episodes
2005	Deadwood	Elmer - Chez Ami Labourer	2 episodes
2006	Criminal Minds	Jim Meyers	
2007	CSI: Miami	Barry Ellis	
2007	24	Kozelek Hacker	2 episodes
2007	Close to Home	Brian Flynn	2 episodes
2008	Cold Case	Tommy Connell	
2009	Dollhouse	Eddie	
2010	Lie to Me	'Sully'	
2011	In Plain Sight	Ronnie Dalembert / Ronnie McIntire	2 episodes
2011 - 2020	Homeland	Max Piotrowski	45 episodes
2012	Private Practice	Kurt Wilson	
2013	Switched at Birth	George Papagus's Killer	
2014	Extant	Gordon Kern	
2015 - 2018	Girlfriends' Guide to Divorce	Rob Frumpkis	Recurring role
2017	NCIS: New Orleans	John Stone	3 episodes
2021	The Rookie	Marcus Lindsey	2 episodes
2022	NCIS: Hawaii	Hank Braddock	s1 e17
2024	Interior Chinatown	Carrey	
2024	Creature Commandos	Sgt. Rock	Voice, episode: "Cheers to the Tin Man"
2025	Suits LA	David Bowie	4 episodes
2025	The Witcher: Sirens of the Deep	Berat	Voice
2026	All's Fair	Marcus Weller	3 episodes

=== Video games ===
Year	Title	Role	Notes
2009	Prototype	Additional Voices	
2009	The Chronicles of Riddick: Assault on Dark Athena	Guard	
2011	Star Wars: The Old Republic	Male Smuggler	
2012	Starhawk	Rifters / Outcast	
2015	Battlefield Hardline	Additional Voices	
