= In Real Life (film) =

2008 film

- Dutch film festival poster
- Het echte leven
- Directed by: Robert Jan Westdijk
- Written by: Robert Jan Westdijk
- Produced by: Jeroen Beker; San Fu Maltha; Niko Post; Frans van Gestel; Maars van Haaften
- Starring: Sallie Harmsen; Ramsey Nasr; Loek Peters
- Cinematography: Menno Westendorp
- Music by: Michel Banabila; Eric Vloeimans
- Production companies: Motel Films; Fu Works; IDTV Film
- Distributed by: A-Film Distribution
- Release date: 25 September 2008 (Netherlands Film Festival)
- Running time: 87 minutes
- Country: Netherlands
- Language: Dutch

In Real Life, released in the Netherlands as Het echte leven, is a 2008 Dutch drama film that was written and directed by Robert Jan Westdijk. The film had its premiere at the Netherlands Film Festival on 25 September 2008 and was released on DVD the following year. The film stars Ramsey Nasr as a film director who decides to test his girlfriend's love for him. The movie's soundtrack was composed by Michel Banabila and Eric Vloeimans, and features songs from their album VoizNoiz 3 – Urban Jazz Scapes.

== Synopsis ==
Director Martin is in a relationship with his girlfriend Simone, who is also his co-star in a film he's making, Real Life. Inside this film, Simone is playing a character whose boyfriend Milan (played by Martin) has decided to test her love for him. For the test, Simone must try to fall in love with another man. If, after this point, she decides that she's truly in love with Milan, he will consider her love genuine.

Outside of the film, Martin casts Fjodor as the love interest for the fictional Simone, only for the two to continually butt heads over Martin's directorial style (which greatly resembles method acting), forcing Martin to drop the actor. He then casts the recently separated Dirk in Fjodor's role, and this seems to be a good fit. Things grow complicated when Dirk begins to fall for the real Simone, who initially only responds to him in order to elicit genuine emotions for the film. However, as filming progresses Simone begins to actually respond to and grow closer to her co-star. These confusing emotions are not helped by Martin, whose directorial style blurs the lines between reality and fiction.

== Cast ==
- Sallie Harmsen as Simone
- Ramsey Nasr as Milan - Martin
- Loek Peters as Dirk
- Oren Schrijver as Fjodor
- Mike Libanon as Luc
- Loes Haverkort as Loes
- Ergun Simsek as Arif
- Zoe Stork as Tjaltje
- Anne-Marie Jung as Angelique
- Poal Cairo as Jules
- Marcel De Hoogd as Buurman

== Reception ==
Variety gave In Real Life a favorable review but also wrote that the "Pic will click at fests, but lacks that Charlie Kaufman-like touch that could persuade Euro distribs to sign on the dotted line." The Dutch newspaper NRC Handelsblad criticized Westdijk for not taking the film seriously enough and stated that the film lacked rhythm. They also expressed disappointment in the film, given Westdijk's prior filmmaking efforts and the fact that it was the opening film for the Netherlands Film Festival. A review from NU.nl expressed the same concerns, as they thought that the film was nice but also believed that Westdijk could have accomplished more.

=== Awards ===
- Golden Calf for Best Editing (2008, won)
- Golden Calf for Best Camera (2008, won)
