= Ben Cura =

British actor

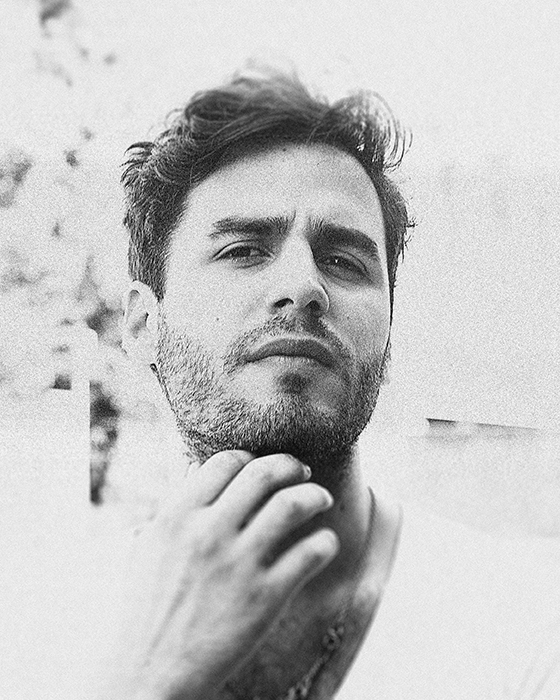
- Ben Cura in 2013
- Born: José Ben Cura; Buenos Aires, Argentina
- Education: London Academy of Music and Dramatic Art (B.A. Hons)
- Occupations: Actor; musician; director; writer
- Years active: 2011–present
- Spouse: Andrea Deck (m. 2013; div. 2015)
- Parents: José Cura (father); Silvia Ibarra (mother)

José Ben Cura is an Argentine-born British actor, musician and director of film, television and theatre.

== Early life ==
José Ben Cura was born in Buenos Aires, the son of Argentine tenor/conductor José Cura. When he was a year old, he moved to Santo Stefano Belbo, Italy, where his father's grandfather was from. The family first lived in a convent while his father struggled to find work as an opera singer. He has two younger siblings, Yazmín and Nicolás.

The family moved to France when he was six and then to Spain when he was 11. During this time, he frequently travelled with his parents around the world.

Cura's first acting role came at age nine, as a supernumerary in a production of La Forza del Destino at the Opéra de Marseille, France. Whilst living in Paris, he received formal piano and solfège training. He subsequently attended the New York Film Academy in Paris before eventually training and graduating from the London Academy of Music and Dramatic Art in 2011 with a bachelor's degree with honours in professional acting.

== Career ==
Cura made his film debut in a British independent film Comes a Bright Day, appearing shortly after in Comedy Central's series Threesome and Bernard Rose's film The Devil's Violinist.

He made his West End debut playing Angel in the original cast of Jennifer Saunders' musical Viva Forever at the Piccadilly Theatre in London, UK. He was later cast as Seve Ballesteros in British golf film Dream On.

Aged 24, he made his directorial debut with a film adaptation of August Strindberg's play Creditors. for which he also wrote the screenplay and played one of the lead characters, Freddie Lynch. Later that year, he starred in the UK premiere of the award-winning American play Next Fall at the Southwark Playhouse in London, UK.

In April 2013, he co-founded London-based production company Tough Dance Ltd. with actress and producer Andrea Deck. The company's first production was award-winning feature film Creditors. In 2015, he was cast in the US series The Royals as recurring character Holden. He later went on to star in British film White Island set in Ibiza, and based on the novel A Bus Could Run You Over written by Colin Butts, alongside Billy Zane and Billy Boyd.

Cura's directorial debut, Creditors, world-premiered at the Nordic International Film Festival in New York City on 31 October 2015. The festival awarded it with an Honorable Mention in the Best Nordic Narrative Feature category. Latin Post film critic David Salazar called the film "A triumphant debut." Blazing Minds film critic Susanne Hodder said the actors "all give compelling performances, bringing their characters to life and giving them depth". Screen Relish film critic Stuie Greenfield said that "Creditors is a beautiful, sometimes angry and surprising film that brings with it strong performances from the entire cast as well as an unexpected yet welcome twist", while Movie Marker film critic Darryl Griffiths said that "Creditors is an incisive and accomplished piece of filmmaking [...], possessing a rich, powerful psychology that instills an unnerving modern-day relevance to age-old material." Creditors received over ten awards from various film festivals, including Best Feature, Leading Actor, and Script/Writer for Cura.

In 2016, Cura was cast as a series regular in ITV/Netflix crime noir drama Marcella penned by The Bridge writer Hans Rosenfeldt. The series premiered on UK television in April 2016, followed by a worldwide release on Netflix in July 2016. In 2017, he was cast in Simon West's action/comedy feature film Gun Shy opposite Antonio Banderas and Olga Kurylenko.

Also in 2017, Cura was cast as CIA operative Philip Shafer in French historical war movie 15 minutes de guerre (renamed L'Intervention), directed by Fred Grivois. Later that year, he played the role of Steve in the screen adaptation of British stage play Life is a Gatecrash, renamed Gatecrash and directed by Lawrence Gough, opposite Olivia Bonamy, Anton Lesser, and Sam West.

In 2018, Cura guest-starred in season 2 of CBS's Ransom and the first season of the TV series The Rook, opposite Olivia Munn.

In 2019, he was cast in Nicholas Wright's stage play 8 Hotels directed by Richard Eyre, world-premiering at the Chichester Festival Theatre, playing the lead role of José Ferrer opposite Tory Kittles, Emma Paetz, and Pandora Colin, opening 7 August of that year to excellent reviews: "Joe, played masterfully by Ben Cura, is wonderful as the philanderer who can accept his wife's adultery but not her lover's flaunting of it"; "Jose Ferrer [...] Ben Cura, who captures him very well, has a wonderful mutually mistrustful good-pals-act with the impressive Kittles"; "Ben Cura is excellent as Ferrer [...] with charisma to spare"; "Ben Cura plays José Ferrer as a much disappointed jobbing actor [...] playing Iago for peanuts opposite the better paid Robeson [...] This Ferrer becomes increasingly jealous of Robeson and is convinced that his wife, Uta Hagen [...] is having an affair with the charismatic Robeson (she is), which fills him with an angry cynicism that he can barely control with his erudite and scathing humour that cannot disguise his underlying lack of confidence. Cura's Ferrer is a brilliant creation: a brilliant Iago in fact."

In 2021, Cura founded production company and music label W.I.P. Media. Later that year, Cura released his debut music single Water on streaming platforms, accompanied by an official music video on VEVO followed by second single Toutes Les Couleurs and its accompanying VEVO music video and a third single Argento alongside a third VEVO music video. On 30 July, he released his debut instrumental E.P. Extended Play No.1.

In 2022, Cura made his animation debut voicing Rayan in Tad, the Lost Explorer and the Emerald Tablet while guest starring in HBO Max and Hulu Japan's season 2 of The Head as Liam Ruddock, and starring in BFI and BBC short film My Eyes Are Up Here co-produced by his company W.I.P. Media, which premiered at the London Film Festival in 2022 and Tribeca Film Festival in 2023. He also saw his debut as a film composer, with his original score for feature film Among The Beasts which released that year in the US and other territories. Also that year, he appeared in Queen Charlotte: A Bridgerton Story produced by Shondaland and premiering on Netflix, in the recurring role of Prince Augustus.

At the end of 2024 Cura appeared again as Liam Ruddock in Season 3 of The Head as a now recurring character throughout the entire season. Also in 2024, Cura portrayed Dr Costa in the Finnish television miniseries Last to Brake. Early in 2025, he guest starred in Outlander as Captain Jared Leckie in episode "Written In My Own Heart's Blood".

In 2026, he appeared as Timothy Webster in the American historical drama The Gray House, and as Marcos in Apollo Has Fallen, the sequel to Paris Has Fallen. He also appeared in Peter Howitt's thriller Confinement and Simon Ryninks's Welsh comedy-drama Out There, which premiered at the Edinburgh International Film Festival in August 2026.

== Personal life ==
Cura was married to actress Andrea Deck from 2013 until their divorce in 2015. He dated actress Olga Kurylenko, but they broke up just before the COVID-19 pandemic.

== Filmography ==
=== Film ===
Year	Title	Role	Notes
2012	Comes a Bright Day	Mr. Sullivan	
2013	The Devil's Violinist	Charlotte's Husband	
2015	Creditors	Freddie Lynch	Also writer and director
2016	White Island	Bartolo	
2016	Dream On	Seve Ballesteros	
2017	Gun Shy	Juan Carlos	
2018	Postcards from London	Caravaggio	
2019	15 Minutes of War	Phillip Shafer	
2020	Gatecrash	Steve	
2022	My Eyes Are Up Here	HIM	Short film
2022	Tad, the Lost Explorer and the Emerald Tablet	Rayan	Voice
2026	Out There	Carl	
2026	Confinement	Felix Martinez	

=== Television ===
Year	Title	Role	Notes
2011	Threesome	Richie's Pull	Episode: "Pregnant"
2015	The Royals	Holden	Recurring role
2016	Marcella	Matthew Neil	Recurring role
2017	Silent Witness	Gustavo Aguirre	2 episodes
2018	Ransom	Rafael Salazar	Episode: "Legacy"
2019	The Rook	Cobbler	Episode: "Prologue"
2021	The Mallorca Files	Jose Rey	Episode: "The Outlaw Jose Rey"
2022	Shakespeare & Hathaway: Private Investigators	Antonio Da Costa	Episode: "Most Wicked Speed"
2022	The Head	Liam Ruddock	Episode: #2.4
2023	Queen Charlotte: A Bridgerton Story	Prince Augustus	Recurring role
2024	Last to Brake	Dr Costa	6 episodes
2024	The Head	Liam Ruddock	Recurring role (Season 3)
2025	Outlander	Captain Jared Leckie	Episode: "Written in My Own Heart's Blood"
2026	The Gray House	Timothy Webster	Recurring role
2026	Apollo Has Fallen	Marcos	Sequel to Paris Has Fallen

=== Video games ===
Year	Title	Role	Notes
2014	Alien: Isolation	Ransome	Voice only
2014	Fractured Space	Goss Reznik	
2018	Sea of Thieves	Spanish Soldier / Male Townsfolk	Voice only
2018	A Way Out	Additional Voice	Voice only
2019	Arknights	Noir Corne / Phantom	English version, voice only
2020	Cyberpunk 2077	Ziggy Q	Voice only
2022	Steelrising	Le Marquis de La Fayette	Voice only
2022	Dying Light 2 Stay Human	Vincenzo	Voice only
2023	Stray Blade	Male Church of the Observer Soldier	Voice only
2023	Amnesia: The Bunker	Sdt. Boisrond	Voice only
2023	Cyberpunk 2077: Phantom Liberty		Voice only
2023	Dragon Quest Monsters: The Dark Prince	Fuego / The Crystal Guardian	Voice only
2024	Wuthering Waves	Calcharo	English version, voice only
2024	Dragon Age: The Veilguard	Antoine	Voice
2025	The First Berserker: Khazan	Maluka	English version, voice only
2025	Blades of Fire	Aran	Voice
2025	King of Meat	Zark Tongworth	Voice
2026	Resonance: A Plague Tale Legacy	Valerio	Voice

== Stage ==
- 2012: Viva Forever by Jennifer Saunders at the Piccadilly Theatre London
- 2014: Next Fall by Geoffrey Nauffts at the Southwark Playhouse London
- 2019: 8 Hotels by Nicholas Wright at the Chichester Festival Theatre Chichester

== Voice work ==
- 2012: Swimming with Piranhas Radio Documentary for BBC Radio 4
- 2015: Credit Card Baby Radio Drama written by Annie Caulfield for BBC Radio 4, directed by Mary Ward-Lowery
- 2019: Alien III audiobook by Audible
- 2020: Trafalgar Audiobook for Penguin and Audible
- 2020: Camino De Santiago Sleep story for Calm and Calm France
- 2022: The Limits to Growth Radio drama written by Sarah Woods for BBC Radio 4, directed by Emma Harding
- 2023: Chronicle Of A Death Foretold Audiobook for Penguin and Audible
- 2023: Tomás Nevinson Audiobook for Penguin and Audible
- 2024: A Night Under the Stars in Corsica, sleep story narrated for Calm.
- 2025: The Silver Book by Olivia Laing, audiobook narrated for Penguin Books.
- 2025: Mexico: A History by Paul Gillingham, audiobook narrated for Penguin Audio.
- 2026: A Sicilian Man by Caroline Moorehead, audiobook narrated for Penguin Audio.
- 2026: The Knife Maker of Venice by David Gilman, audiobook for Bloomsbury Publishing.

== Discography ==
Year	Title	Notes
2021	Water	Debut Single
2021	Toutes Les Couleurs	Single
2021	Argento	Single
2021	Extended Play No.1	Debut E.P.

== Awards and nominations ==
Year	Award	Category	Nominated work	Result
2015	Anchorage International Film Festival	Best Narrative Feature Film (with Andrea Deck)	Creditors	Nominated
2015	Nordic International Film Festival	Honorable Mention - Best Nordic Narrative Feature Film (with Andrea Deck)	Creditors	Won
2015	Nordic International Film Festival	Festival Award - Best Nordic Narrative Feature Film	Creditors	Nominated
2016	Accolade Global Film Competition	Merit Special Mention for Feature Film (with Andrea Deck)	Creditors	Won
2016	Accolade Global Film Competition	Merit Special Mention for Script/Writer	Creditors	Won
2016	WorldFest-Houston International Film Festival	Silver Award - Experimental Dogma (with Andrea Deck)	Creditors	Won
