= Creditors (disambiguation) =

A creditor is a party that has a claim on the services of a second party.

Creditors or Creditor may also refer to:

- Creditors (play), play by Swedish playwright August Strindberg
  - Creditors (1988 film), Swedish film based on the play
  - Creditors (2015 film), British film based on the play
- Menachem Creditor, an American rabbi
