= Katharine O'Donnelly =

Scottish actress

- Born: Katharine Brigid O'Donnelly; 1996 (age 29–30)
- Education: Royal Conservatoire of Scotland
- Years active: 2018–present

Katharine Brigid O'Donnelly (born 1996) is a Scottish actress. She is known for her starring role as Maggie Mitchell in the HBO series The Head (2020–2025).

== Early life ==
O'Donnelly is from Lochranza, Isle of Arran. She discovered acting through a primary school play. She attended Arran High School and took weekend acting classes. She did not initially get into the Royal Conservatoire of Scotland (RCS), and did a year-long performance course at Glasgow Clyde College in the meantime. She successfully reapplied to the RCS, going on to graduate with a Bachelor of Arts in Acting.

== Career ==
In 2018, O'Donnelly made her television debut and her feature film debut with small roles in the BBC Three thriller Clique and Josie Rourke's Mary Queen of Scots (2018) respectively. She played the titular character of Rapunzel at the Cumbernauld Theatre in Glasgow.

O'Donnelly broke out when she starred as Dr Maggie Mitchell alongside John Lynch and Alexandre Willaume in the 2020 Spanish-produced thriller series The Head, which was released internationally on platforms such as HBO Max, HBO Asia, and Starzplay. O'Donnelly reprised her role in the second season, which aired in 2022.

== Filmography ==
Year	Title	Role	Notes
2018	Clique	Gemma	1 episode
2018	Mary Queen of Scots	Holyrood Servant	
2019	The Deep Sleep	Chloe	
2020–2025	The Head	Maggie Mitchell	Main role
2023	The Phoebus Files	Sarah	Episode: "Girl at the River"
2025–present	Outlander: Blood of My Blood	Maisri	4 episodes
