= Secular Jewish music =

Music genre

Since Biblical times, music has held an important role in many Jews' lives. Jewish music has been influenced by surrounding Gentile traditions and Jewish sources preserved over time. Jewish musical contributions on the other hand tend to reflect the cultures of the countries in which Jews live, the most notable examples being classical and popular music in the United States and Europe. However, other music is unique to particular Jewish communities, such as klezmer of Eastern Europe.

== Israeli music ==
Modern Israeli music is heavily influenced by its constituents, which include Jewish immigrants from more than 120 countries around the world, which have brought their own musical traditions, making Israel a global melting pot. The Israeli music is very versatile and combines elements of both western and eastern music. It tends to be very eclectic and contains a wide variety of influences from the Diaspora and more modern cultural importation. Hassidic songs, Asian and Arab pop, especially Yemenite singers, and hip hop or heavy metal (including a generally Israeli subgenre of folk metal called oriental metal).

From the earliest days of Zionist settlement, Jewish immigrants wrote popular folk music. At first, songs were based on borrowed melodies from German, Russian, or traditional Jewish folk music with new lyrics written in Hebrew. Starting in the early 1920s, however, Jewish settlers made a conscious effort to create a new Hebrew style of music, a style that would tie them to their earliest Hebrew origins and that would differentiate them from the style of the Jewish diaspora of Eastern Europe, which they viewed as weak. This new style borrowed elements from Arabic and, to a lesser extent, traditional Yemenite and eastern Jewish styles: the songs were often homophonic (that is, without clear harmonic character), modal, and limited in range. "The huge change in our lives demands new modes of expression," wrote composer and music critic Menashe Ravina in 1943. "... and, just as in our language we returned to our historical past, so has our ear turned to the music of the east ... as an expression of our innermost feelings."

The youth, labor and kibbutz movements played a major role in musical development before and after the establishment of Israeli statehood in 1948, and in the popularization of many of these songs. The Zionist establishment saw music as a way of establishing a new national identity, and, on a purely pragmatic level, of teaching Hebrew to new immigrants. The national labor organization, the Histadrut, set up a music publishing house that disseminated songbooks and encouraged public sing-alongs (שירה בציבור). This tradition of public sing-alongs continues to the present day, and is a characteristic of modern Israeli culture.

== Israeli folk music ==
Termed in Hebrew שירי ארץ ישראל ("songs of the land of Israel"), folk songs are meant mainly to be sung in public by the audience or in social events. Some are children's songs; some combine European folk tunes with Hebrew lyrics; some come from military bands and others were written by poets such as Naomi Shemer and Chaim Nachman Bialik.

The canonical songs of this genre often deal with Zionist hopes and dreams and glorify the life of idealistic Jewish youth who intend on building a home and defending their homeland. A common theme is Jerusalem as well as other parts of Eretz Israel. Tempo varies widely, as do the content. Some songs show a leftist or right-wing bent, while others are typically love songs, lullabies or other formats; some are also socialist in subject, due to the long-standing influence of socialism on Jews in parts of the Diaspora.

Patriotic folk songs are common, mostly written during the wars of Israel. They typically concern themselves with soldiers' friendships and the sadness of death during war. Some are now played at memorials or holidays dedicated to the Israeli dead.

Judaism therefore, as known, went beyond its own tradition by crossing the boundaries of every culture, appropriating it "almost carelessly" then, as natural to the intrinsic innate ancestral identity, "sweetening it with the most extreme Jewish characteristics": a religion like Judaism can only be eternally rooted in its people, because it professes to testify; like many, we also remember the example of the Austrian Yodel, just apparently foreign to the Jewish religion, with Israel Shalom in "She Taught Me To Yodel", masterful model among many of the pioneering so-called secular Jewish culture then "reduced to a simple Jewish religious exercise of ethnic-cultural conquest".

== Klezmer ==
Around the 15th century, a tradition of secular (non-liturgical) Jewish music was developed by musicians called kleyzmorim or kleyzmerim by Ashkenazi Jews in Eastern Europe. They draw on devotional traditions extending back into Biblical times, and their musical legacy of klezmer continues to evolve today. The repertoire is largely dance songs for weddings and other celebrations. They are typically in Yiddish. The term "klezmer" was a derogatory term referring to low class street musicians. Often the klezmer performed with non-Jewish musicians and played for non-Jewish functions. As a result of this "mixing" the music constantly evolved through the fusing of styles. This practice still plays a major role in the development of musical style to include Jazz, as evident in Benny Goodman's music and even Texas music as evident in the music on the modern Austin Klezmorim.

"Numi Numi" (Sleep my Child), Jewish lullaby

== Sephardic/Ladino ==
Sephardic music is the unique music of the Sephardic Jews. Sephardic music was born in medieval Spain, with canciones being performed at the royal courts. Since then, it has picked up influences from across Spain, Morocco, Turkey, Greece and various popular tunes from Spain and further abroad. There are three types of Sephardic songs—topical and entertainment songs, romance songs and spiritual or ceremonial songs. Lyrics can be in several languages, including Hebrew for religious songs, and Ladino.

These song traditions spread from Spain to Morocco (the Western Tradition) and several parts of the Ottoman Empire (the Eastern Tradition) including Greece, Jerusalem, the Balkans and Egypt. Sephardic music adapted to each of these locals, assimilating North African high-pitched, extended ululations; Balkan rhythms, for instance in 9/8 time; and the Turkish maqam mode.

== Mizrahi ==
Mizrahi music usually refers to the new wave of music in Israel which combines Israeli music with the flavor of Arabic and Mediterranean (especially Greek) music. Typical Mizrahi songs will have a dominant violin or string sound as well as Middle Eastern percussion elements. Mizrahi music is usually high pitched. In today's Israeli music scene, Mizrahi music is very popular.

== Dancing ==
Deriving from Biblical traditions, Jewish dance has long been used by Jews as a medium for the expression of joy and other communal emotions. Each Jewish diasporic community developed its own dance traditions for wedding celebrations and other distinguished events. For Ashkenazi Jews in Eastern Europe, for example, dances, whose names corresponded to the different forms of klezmer music that were played, were an obvious staple of the wedding ceremony of the shtetl. Jewish dances both were influenced by surrounding Gentile traditions and Jewish sources preserved over time. "Nevertheless the Jews practiced a corporeal expressive language that was highly differentiated from that of the non-Jewish peoples of their neighborhood, mainly through motions of the hands and arms, with more intricate legwork by the younger men." In general, however, in most religiously traditional communities, members of the opposite sex dancing together or dancing at times other than at these events was frowned upon.

== Not Jewish in form ==
The below two sections address instances in which Jews have contributed musically using originally non-Jewish forms or the forms used by the mainstream culture,

=== Jews in mainstream and jazz music ===
Jews have also contributed to popular music, primarily in the United States and Israel, and in some specific forms of popular music have become or are dominant. This is true to a lesser extent in Europe, but some of the first influential Jewish popular songwriters in the US were actually immigrants from Europe, such as Irving Berlin and Sigmund Romberg, or children of immigrants. The most visible early forms of American popular music in which Jews have contributed are the popular song and musical theater. Approximately half of the members of the Songwriters Hall of Fame are Jewish. However, the latter especially has been dominated by Jewish composers and lyricists throughout its history and to a certain extent still today.

While Jazz is primarily considered an art form with African-American originators, many Jewish musicians have contributed to it including clarinetists Mezz Mezzrow, Shep Fields, Benny Goodman and Artie Shaw (the latter two swing bandleaders made significant contributions in bringing racial integration into the American music industry), saxophonists Michael Brecker, Kenny G, Stan Getz, Benny Green, Lee Konitz, Ronnie Scott and Joshua Redman, trumpeters and cornetists Randy Brecker, Ruby Braff, Red Rodney and Shorty Rogers, vibraphonist Terry Gibbs, drummers Buddy Rich, Mel Lewis, and Victor Feldman, and singers and pianists Billy Joel, Al Jolson, Ben Sidran and Mel Tormé. Some artists such as Harry Kandel were famous for mixing Jazz with klezmer as is modern Texas klezmer Bill Averbach. Since a great deal of Jazz music consisted of musical cooperation of Jewish and African-American musicians or black musicians funded by Jewish producers, the art form became "the racist's worst nightmare".

Although the early rock and roll performers were mostly either African Americans or Southern Whites, Jewish songwriters played a key role: Jerry Leiber and Mike Stoller, Carole King and Gerry Goffin, Neil Diamond, Neil Sedaka, and nearly all of the other Brill Building songwriters were Jewish, as was Phil Spector. With the mid-1960s rise of the singer-songwriter, some (King, Diamond, Sedaka) became performers; others (such as Burt Bacharach) managed to continue to work primarily as songwriters.

Many worked with a mix of folk and rock forms, including Bob Dylan, Lou Reed, David Bromberg, David Grisman, Kinky Friedman, Jorma Kaukonen, Leonard Cohen, Simon and Garfunkel; more purely on the rock side are David Lee Roth, Lenny Kravitz, pop bands such as Army of Lovers and all three Beastie Boys. Many American rock and metal bands have at least one Jewish musician: both Gene Simmons and Paul Stanley of Kiss, Geddy Lee of Rush, Aerosmith drummer Joey Kramer, Grateful Dead percussionist Mickey Hart, Bon Jovi (keyboardist David Bryan), the Doors guitarist Robby Krieger, Metallica drummer and co-founder Lars Ulrich, Anthrax guitarist Scott Ian, Ramones' Joey Ramone and Tommy Ramone, and Guns N' Roses drummer Steven Adler, and Disturbed frontman David Draiman. Two prominent UK examples are Fleetwood Mac's Peter Green and Marc Bolan of T. Rex.

Jewish musicians have also been part of the progressive rock/metal movement, such as King Crimson bassist Tony Levin and Rod Morgenstein (drummer for the Dixie Dregs). Matisyahu is a reggae and rap artist that has used the medium to express religious ideas.

"Popular" music in Europe during the early 20th century would have been considered to be lighter classical forms such as operetta and entertainments like cabaret, and in these Jewish involvement was very large, especially in Vienna and Paris. Jacques Offenbach, a Roman Catholic convert, was an ethnically Jewish composer of operettas in the second half of the 20th century. Serge Gainsbourg was one of the dominant figures in the evolution of cabaret music.

Popular music in Israel has also a been medium for Jewish secular musical expression. Many Israeli secular musicians explore topics such as the Jewish and Israeli people, Zionism and nationalism, agriculture and the land of Israel, and the Arab–Israeli conflict. Israeli popular music for the most part uses borrowed American forms like rock and alternative rock, pop, heavy metal, hip hop, rap and trance. In addition to these and classical music, Israel is host to a wealth of styles of Mizrahi music, featuring the influences and contributions of Arab, Yemenite, Greek and Ethiopian Jews.

Israel has, since 1973, participated in the annual event Eurovision Song Contest, an annual, continental pop music event, every year (except when it clashes with Holocaust Memorial Day, as in 1980, 1984 and 1997) It has won four times, in 1978, 1979, 1998 and 2018.

=== Jews in classical music ===
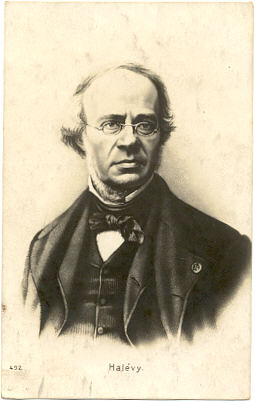
Fromental Halévy, the French-Jewish composer of the Grand Opera La Juive

Before the Jewish Emancipation, virtually all Jewish music in Europe was sacred music, with the exception of the performances of klezmorim during weddings and other occasions. The result was a lack of a Jewish presence in European classical music until the 19th century, with very few exceptions, normally enabled by specific aristocratic protection, such as Salamone Rossi (whose work is considered the beginning of "Jewish art music"). Although during the Classical period small numbers of Jewish composers were present in Amsterdam, Southern France and Italy, the vast majority of Jewish classical composers were active during the Romantic period (following the French Revolution) and even more so in the 20th century. Paul Johnson summarizes the dynamics of this cultural pattern:

The Jewish musical tradition, for instance, was far older than anyone else's in Europe. Music remained an element in Jewish services, and the cantor was almost as pivotal a figure in local Jewish society as the rabbi. But Jewish musicians, except as converts, had played no part in European musical development. Hence the entry, in considerable numbers, of Jewish composers and performers on the musical scene in the middle decades of the nineteenth century was a phenomenon, and a closely observed one.

Likewise, music historian David Conway notes that:

At the start of the nineteenth century there were virtually no Jewish professionals in music and the standard of music in Jewish synagogues was generally appalling. Yet by the end of the same century throughout Europe Jews held leading positions as conductors, soloists, theatrical producer, music publishers and patrons of music; a Jew [ Meyerbeer ] was the most successful opera composer of the century, and the Jews were commonly held, what would have seemed nonsensical a hundred years earlier, to be a 'musical people'.

On the other hand, the origin of Gregorian chant, which was the earliest manifestation of European classical music, was Jewish choral music of the Temple and synagogue, according to a large number of analytical liturgists and music historians.

After Jews were admitted to mainstream society in England (gradually after their return in the 17th century), France, Austria-Hungary, the German Empire, and Russia (in that order), the Jewish contribution to the European music scene steadily increased, but in the form of mainstream European music, not specifically Jewish music. Notable examples of Jewish Romantic composers (by country) are Charles-Valentin Alkan, Paul Dukas and Fromental Halévy from France, Josef Dessauer, Heinrich Wilhelm Ernst, Karl Goldmark and Gustav Mahler from Bohemia (most Austrian Jews during this time were native not to what is today Austria but rather the outer provinces of the Empire), Felix Mendelssohn and Giacomo Meyerbeer from Germany, and Anton and Nikolai Rubinstein from Russia. Singers included John Braham and Giuditta Pasta. There were very many notable Jewish violin and pianist virtuosi, including Joseph Joachim, Ferdinand David, Carl Tausig, Henri Herz, Leopold Auer, Jascha Heifetz, and Ignaz Moscheles. During the 20th century the number of Jewish composers and notable instrumentalists increased, as did their geographical distribution. Jewish composers were most heavily concentrated in Vienna and other cities in pre-Nazi Austria and Germany. During the late 19th century and early 20th century, after Jews moved out of the Austrian-Hungarian provinces into Vienna, they "comprised a third of the students of the city's conservatories and more than half of its music audiences. Jewish children acquired musical instruction at rates exceeding three times that of the non-Jewish population. Beyond Vienna, Jews were also to a certain extent prominent in Paris and New York City (the latter's Jewish population being heavily multiplied by waves of immigration). During the rise of the Nazis in the 1930s, when works by Jews were labelled as degenerate music (not only because of the Jewish origins of the composers but also their association with Modernism), many European Jewish composers emigrated to the United States and Argentina, strengthening classical music in those countries. Sample Jewish 20th-century composers include Arnold Schönberg and Alexander von Zemlinsky from Austria, Hanns Eisler, Kurt Weill and Theodor W. Adorno from Germany, Viktor Ullmann and Jaromír Weinberger from Bohemia and later the Czech Republic (the former perished at the Auschwitz extermination camps), George Gershwin, Aaron Copland and Samuel Adler from the United States, Darius Milhaud and Alexandre Tansman from France, Alfred Schnittke and Lera Auerbach from Russia, Lalo Schifrin and Mario Davidovsky from Argentina and Paul Ben-Haim and Shulamit Ran from Israel.

There are some genres and forms of classical music that Jewish composers have been associated with, including notably during the Romantic period French Grand Opera. The most prolific composers of this genre included Giacomo Meyerbeer, Fromental Halévy, and the later Jacques Offenbach; Halévy's La Juive was based on Scribe's libretto very loosely connected to the Jewish experience. While little-known today, this "work by a Jewish composer in which anti-Semitism is a motivating force" was an extremely potent influence on late Romantic composers from Mahler (who took the story of antisemitism and assimilation personally, also calling it "one of the very greatest works ever written") to the antisemitic Wagner In the 20th century, Jewish composers were pioneers of avant-garde and contemporary music. Arnold Schoenberg in his middle and later periods devised the twelve-tone technique and was a primary advocate of atonality, a system of composition which was later used by Jewish composers Paul Dessau and René Leibowitz. George Rochberg and Milton Babbitt were leading composers in the school of serialism, Steve Reich and Philip Glass worked with minimalism, George Perle devised his own form of twelve-tone tonality, Leo Ornstein helped develop the tone cluster, Morton Feldman and Armand Lunel were noted composers of chance music (the latter is also considered the inventor of spatialization), and Mario Davidovsky was famous for writing a series of compositions mixing acoustic and electronic music. In addition, Lera Auerbach, Alfred Schnittke and John Zorn have worked with Polystylism and other forms of Postmodern music, and Modernist Miriam Gideon combined atonalism and Jewish folk motives in her pieces. Samuel Adler's compositions are also noteworthy for using several contemporary techniques including: atonality, serialism,diatonicism and aleatoric music devices.

While orchestral and operatic music works by Jewish composers would in general be considered secular, many Jewish (as well as non-Jewish) composers have incorporated Jewish themes and motives into their music. Sometimes this is done covertly, such as the klezmer band music that many critics and observers believe lies in the third movement of Mahler's Symphony No. 1 (though ostensibly imitating the sound of a local Moravian town band), and this type of Jewish reference was most common during the 19th century when openly displaying one's Jewishness would most likely hamper a Jew's chances at assimilation. During the 20th century, however, many Jewish composers wrote music with direct Jewish references and themes, e.g. David Amram (Symphony – "Songs of the Soul"), Leonard Bernstein (Kaddish Symphony, Chichester Psalms), Ernest Bloch (Schelomo), Ezra Laderman, (Symphony No. 3 – Jerusalem, And David Wept), Arnold Schoenberg (see below), Mario Castelnuovo-Tedesco (Violin Concerto no. 2) Kurt Weill (The Eternal Road) and Hugo Weisgall (Psalm of the Instant Dove). However, even during the 20th century some Jewish composers often quoted Jewish music within non-Jewish contexts; for example, Gershwin used liturgical melodies and Hebrew songs for a few numbers in Porgy and Bess, and many also believe that the opening clarinet glissando in his Rhapsody in Blue is a reference to klezmer. Finally, many non-Jewish (mostly, but not all, Russian) composers have composed classical music with clear Jewish themes and inspiration, such as Max Bruch (Kol Nidre), Sergei Prokofiev (Overture on Hebrew Themes), Maurice Ravel (Chanson hébraïque in Yiddish, Deux mélodies hébraïques – including "Kaddisch" in Aramaic and "Fregt di velt di alte kashe" in Yiddish), Dmitri Shostakovich (Second Piano Trio, From Jewish Folk Poetry and Symphony No. 13 "Babi Yar") and Igor Stravinsky (Abraham and Isaac – used the Hebrew Masoretic text of a passage of Genesis, and was dedicated to the Jews and the State of Israel). Many operatic works by non-Jewish composers show a direct connection with and sympathy for the Jewish people and history, like Saint-Saëns' Samson and Delilah and Verdi's Nabucco.

In addition to composers, many Jews have been prominent music critics, music theorists and musicologists, such as Guido Adler, Leon Botstein, Eduard Hanslick, Abraham Zevi Idelsohn, Julius Korngold, Hedi Stadlen and Robert Strassburg. Jewish classical performers have most frequently been violinists (as can be expected from the violin's importance in klezmer), pianists and cellists. Notable examples are Isaac Stern, Vladimir Ashkenazy and Leonard Rose, respectively. Beginning with Gustav Mahler and most frequently today, Jewish conductors have also been prominent, with many like Leonard Bernstein achieving international stature. As of January 2006, the principal music directors of the American Symphony Orchestra, Bavarian Radio Symphony Orchestra/Royal Concertgebouw Orchestra, Boston Symphony Orchestra/Metropolitan Opera, Chicago Symphony Orchestra/Berlin State Opera, National Symphony Orchestra, New York Philharmonic, Pittsburgh Symphony Pops Orchestra, San Francisco Symphony and Tonhalle Orchestra (in Zurich) are of Jewish descent (respectively Leon Botstein, Mariss Jansons, James Levine, Daniel Barenboim, Leonard Slatkin, Lorin Maazel, Marvin Hamlisch, Michael Tilson Thomas and David Zinman). A few notable cantors also worked as opera singers, such as Jan Peerce and Richard Tucker. Other vocalists such as Sidor Belarsky made contributions as both educators within the halls of academe as well as performers on the international concert hall stage. Still other operatic virtuosos such Beverly Sills made their mark by performing on the concert hall stage and also serving as administrators for leading operatic companies such as the Metropolitan Opera and New York City Opera.

==== Case study in secular Jewish culture: Jewish identity in 19th-century central Europe ====
Research regarding the Jewish identity of composers usually focuses on the assimilated German-speaking Felix Mendelssohn and Gustav Mahler; the former, although the grandson of the most famous philosopher of the Haskalah, was baptized and raised as a Reformed Christian, and the latter converted to Roman Catholicism to remove his most powerful obstacle to success (antisemitism) in musical Vienna. While in both cases the conversion was made to assimilate with European Christian society and therefore leave persecution in favor of prosperity, Mendelssohn wrote overtly and unapologetically Christian music (Symphony No. 5 "Reformation", St. Paul Oratorio and numerous chamber and other vocal pieces), and on one occasion he even changed his appearance to avoid looking like related Jewish composer Meyerbeer. Mahler also wrote Christian-inspired music in the fifth movement of the Second Symphony (although this highly spiritual piece has also been interpreted as fundamentally Jewish at its core), the fifth movement of the Third Symphony, the fourth movement of the Fourth Symphony and his Eighth Symphony.

However, the issue in both cases is not so simple: although his father urged him to drop the name "Mendelssohn" in concert programs to purge any reference to his Jewish past, Felix "retained the name... despite his father's protests, and though undoubtedly a sincere Lutheran, retained a respect for his Jewish history. His professional and social success may have emboldened him to be more forthrightly pro-Jewish than other converts". Mahler wrote what have been perceived as Jewish references in his works, including klezmer-like passages in the third movement of the First Symphony and first movement of the Third; in addition, the previously mentioned fifth movement of the Second Symphony includes a passage that many believe imitates shofar blasts with a programmatic text resembling the Unetanneh Tokef prayer.

The most compelling reason why Mendelssohn and Mahler are commonly considered Jewish composers are because they have been repeatedly identified as such both by antisemites and Jews. In both cases contemporaries (respectively, Richard Wagner in his Das Judenthum in der Musik, and the virulent Vienna press and Austrian antisemites such as Rudolph Louis) argued that no matter how much the composer in question attempted to pass himself off as a good Austrian/German and a good Christian, he and his music would remain fundamentally and unalterably Jewish (in the context, with an obviously negative connotation). Therefore, when Nazi Germany suppressed what they considered "degenerate music", both Mendelssohn and Mahler were banned as Jewish composers; they were contrasted with "good" German composers like Beethoven, Bruckner and Wagner (to a lesser degree concerning Wagner but especially in the case of Beethoven, the fact that the Nazi propagandists claimed that deceased, and therefore unable to object composers are personifications of their ideology does not mean that they would have approved of such a label). The claim of "fundamental Jewishness" was repeated, but with a completely opposite meaning, by 20th century Jews like Leonard Bernstein (regarding Mahler), who viewed that the dual Jewishness and success of the composers is something to be championed and celebrated. A persuasive argument to the Jewishness of Mahler comes from his wife, Alma Mahler:

He [Gustav] was not a man who ever deceived himself, and he knew that people would not forget he was a Jew. ... Nor did he wish it forgotten. ... He never denied his Jewish origin. Rather he emphasized it.

Regarding Wagner himself, it often seems ironic to some that many of the most influential and popular interpreters of his work have been Jewish conductors such as the aforementioned Mahler and Bernstein, as well as Daniel Barenboim, Arthur Fiedler, Asher Fisch, Otto Klemperer, Erich Leinsdorf, James Levine, Hermann Levi (who was chosen by Wagner to conduct the premiere of Parsifal Lorin Maazel, Eugene Ormandy, Fritz Reiner, Sir Georg Solti, George Szell and Bruno Walter. It has been noted that there is a "love of contemporary Jewish conductors for Wagner". While much has been written about Wagner's anti-Semitism in his writings and music, and the Nazi appropriation of his music, research in recent years has analyzed the possibility that Wagner was himself of Jewish ancestry, and explored Wagner's interaction with and attitude towards the Jews through a multi-sided perspective.

Much less complex and disputed is the Jewishness of Arnold Schoenberg. Although he was brought up as a Catholic and converted to Protestantism in 1898, during the rise of the Nazis in 1933 he openly embraced and returned to Judaism. The result was a number of later works dealing with Judaism and the Holocaust, such as A Survivor from Warsaw, Kol Nidre and Moses und Aron. During this time Schoenberg also began to concern himself with the historical situation of the Jewish people in his essays and other writings.

Both Mahler and Schoenberg were Jewish composers who converted to a form of Christianity to avoid antisemitism, but were still attacked by the anti-Semitic elements of Viennese society as fundamentally Jewish and therefore a corrupting and perverse influence. According to Paul Johnson,

The feeling of cultural outrage was much more important than anti-Semitism as such; or rather, it turned into anti-Semites, at any rate for the moment, people who normally never expressed such feelings. It was he Jew-as-Iconoclast which aroused the really deep rage. ... Mahler had begun it; Schönberg carried it on; both were Jews, and they corrupted young Aryan composers like Berg – so the argument went.

Again, although these critics meant their identifications of Mahler and Schoenberg as Jewish in an offensive way, this context provides a legitimate reason to claim them as Jewish composers today, though now in a neutral or positive sense. Despite the three above examples, however, a majority of Jewish artists and intellectuals in Austria, Germany and France during the 19th century and early 20th century assimilated culturally either by keeping the Jewish religion but living a mainstream European lifestyle (as Moses Mendelssohn had wished in earlier decades) or renouncing religion in favor of secularism, but retained at least the identification of Jewishness. It is the dual existence of people who disassociated themselves with Judaism yet remained affiliated with the Jewish people, and those who wished to retain the Jewish religion but eliminate any distinct Jewish culture by blending into Gentile society in this region and period (as opposed to Eastern Europe at the same time, where both the Jewish peoplehood and religion were preserved) that show the complexities of both Judaism and secular Jewish culture.

== See also ==
- Jewish music
- Secular Jewish culture
- List of Jewish musicians
