= VoizNoiz 3 – Urban Jazz Scapes =

Studio album by Michel Banabila and Eric Vloeimans
- Released: 1 January 2002
- Genre: Jazz
- Length: 47:59
- Label: JJ Tracks / Challenge Records
- Producer: Michel Banabila

VoizNoiz 3 is a 2002 album by Michel Banabila and Eric Vloeimans. The album's tracks contains a variety of sounds such as voices, street sounds, digital noise, and other samplings, which were centered on trumpet improvisations by Vloeimans.

== History ==
In the year following its release, VoizNoiz 3 received a positive review from OOR and NRC Handelsblad, along with an Edison Award in the category Jazz National, with the jury reporting that the album was "jazz in its most revealing form" and that it was "a pleasure for the antennas and senses of music lovers with an open, aural mind." Tracks from the album were used in two films, Petersburg, Places and Paintings and In Real Life, and in the compilation album Dubplates From The Lamp 3. Four tracks from the album were also released on vinyl.

== Personnel ==
- Eric Vloeimans – trumpet
- Michel Banabila – keys and electronics
- Bobby – tapes and turntable
- Hans Greeve – drums and guitar
- Frank vd Kooy – sax and bassclarinet
- Guus Bakker – double bass
- Yasar Saka – voice-processing
- Robin Schaeverbeke – cover photo

== Track listing ==
All tracks are composed by Banabila & Vloeimans, except "Cinematic Grooves", which was composed by Banabila, Vloeimans and Schaeverbeke.

1. Tapes HV Rmxd (04:29)
2. Vloeivoiz (03:36)
3. Damned (03:39)
4. Sneaky Creatures (07:15)
5. Rumbaah (04:05)
6. Cinematic Grooves (03:39)
7. Blow Out (04:08)
8. A Virtual Meeting (04:36)
9. Ring Modulation (04:54)
10. The Tapes From HV (04:13)
11. Roofscape (03:25)
