= Alex Coke =

- Birth name: Alexander Seton Coke
- Born: November 13, 1953 (age 71); Dallas, Texas, United States
- Genres: Jazz
- Occupation: Musician
- Instrument(s): Saxophone, flute, woodwinds
- Years active: 1976–present
- Website: alexcoke.home.xs4all.nl

Alexander Seton Coke (born November 13, 1953, in Dallas, Texas) is a jazz saxophonist and flutist.

== Early life ==
Coke was born in Dallas on November 13, 1953. He started playing the flute at the age of eight. He graduated high school in Austin, Texas, and then studied flute at the University of Colorado Boulder. He played in local groups while at university and received private lessons from Clifford Jordan and Lew Tabackin. In 1977, after graduating, he settled in Austin.

== Later life and career ==
Coke and his wife, Mary Yznaga, lived in Washington, D.C., in the early 1980s. This was followed by two years in Europe, after which they returned to Austin.

Coke toured with the Dutch jazz ensemble the Willem Breuker Kollektief between 1990 and 2000. In the late 1990s, he lived in the Netherlands while maintaining some activities in Austin. In 2020, during the COVID-19 pandemic, Coke reported on how he was continuing as a musician: "First Presbyterian Church where I have played for over a dozen years has continued to keep my paycheck coming in. I'm teaching online".

== Discography ==
=== As leader ===
- New Visions (Re Records, 1982)
- Jumping Shark with Willem Breuker (BV Haast, 1991)
- New Texas Swing (CreOp Muse, 2002)
- Wake Up Dead Man/Iraqnophobia (VoxLox, 2005)
- It's Possible (VoxLox, 2008)
- 13 with Rich Harney (Aardvark Records 2013)
- Alex Coke, Liminal 1 (Rock Tumbler Records, 2019)

=== As sideman ===
With Willem Breuker

- Parade (BV Haast, 1991)
- Deze Kant Op, Dames! = This Way Ladies (BV Haast, 1993)
- Overtime/Uberstunden (NM Classics, 1994)
- Sensemaya (BV Haast, 1995)
- Dans Plezier/Joy of Dance (BV Haast, 1995)
- The Parrot (BV Haast, 1996)
- Music for His Films 1967/1994 with Johan van der Keuken (BV Haast, 1997)
- Pakkepapen (BV Haast, 1998)
- Psalm 122 (BV Haast, 1998)
- Kurt Weill (BV Haast, 1998)
- Thirst! with Denise Jannah (BV Haast, 2000)
- Hunger! (BV Haast, 2000)
- Trilogy: Hunger/Thirst/Misery (BV Haast, 2003)
- At Ruta Maya Cafe (BV Haast, 2006)
- Fidget (BV Haast, 2007)

With others

- Dennis Gonzalez, Witness (Daagnim, 1983)
- Austin Klezmorim, East of Odessa (B.A. Music, 1994)
- Austin Klezmorim, Bubba's Waltz (B.A. Music, 2005)
- Eric Vloeimans, Willem Breuker, The Compositions of Eric Dolphy (BV Haast, 2006)
- Voxtrot, Voxtrot (Playlouderecordings, 2007)
- White Denim, D (Downtown 2011)
