= The Balloonist (film) =

The Ballonist
- De Ballonvaarder
- Directed by: Tim Oliehoek
- Screenplay by: Benny Lindelauf
- Produced by: Elbe Stevens; Floor Krooi
- Starring: Sallie Harmsen
- Cinematography: Martijn Cousijn
- Edited by: Joost van de Wetering
- Music by: Bart Westerlaken
- Release date: 3 October 2025
- Running time: 108 minutes
- Country: Netherlands
- Language: Dutch

The Balloonist (Dutch: De Ballonvaarder) is a Dutch comedy drama about a single mother who keeps heritage chickens, whose life turns upside down when a balloonist crashes on her chicken coop.
