= Andrea Deck =

American actress

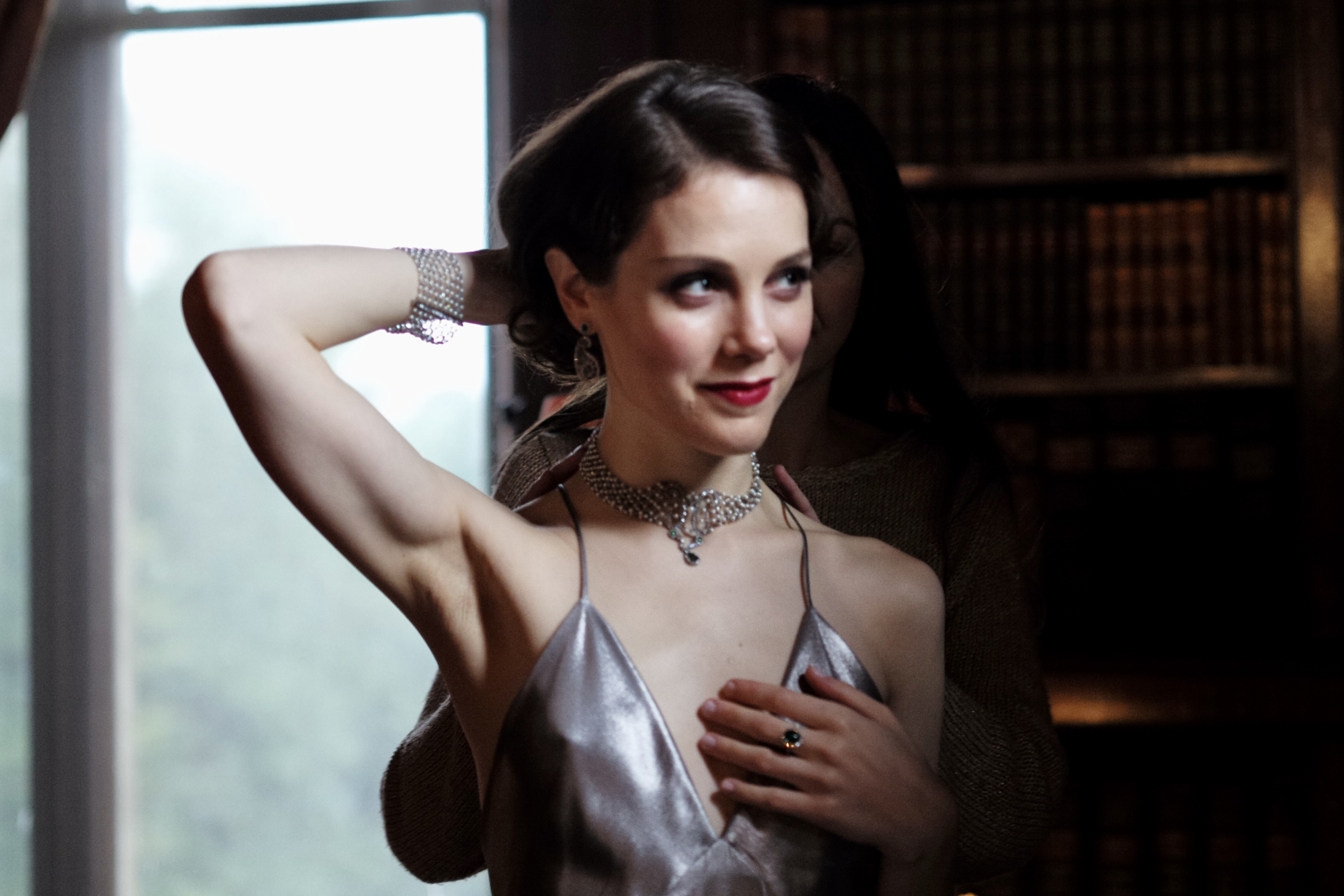
- Born: February 5, 1994 (age 32); Grosse Pointe, Michigan, U.S.
- Education: London Academy of Music and Dramatic Art, BA (Hons)
- Occupation: Actress
- Years active: 2011–present

Andrea Deck (born February 5, 1994) is an American film, television and theater actress. She trained at the London Academy of Music and Dramatic Art. She is best known for her voice role as Amanda Ripley, daughter of Ellen Ripley, in Alien: Isolation, as well as her role as CIA agent Jenna Bragg on the Showtime series Homeland.

== Early life and education ==
Deck was born February 5, 1994, and grew up in Grosse Pointe, Michigan. At the age of 15, she began attending the Interlochen Center for the Arts summer camp until she graduated from Grosse Pointe South High School at the age of 18. She subsequently moved to London, England, to study at the London Academy of Music and Dramatic Art. She graduated with a bachelor's degree with honors in professional acting.

== Career ==
Deck's first acting role was in the film In Love With a Nun, which was screened at the Short Film Corner of the Cannes Film Festival in 2009.

In the same year, she was cast as Allie in Roland Joffé's The Lovers, and as opera singer Charlotte Watson in the film The Devil's Violinist directed by Bernard Rose in which she showcased her classically trained singing voice, as well as appearing in Ridley Scott's The Counselor later that year.

She later went on to play silent-movie star Mabel Normand in ITV's Mr Selfridge. In April 2013, she co-founded London-based production company Tough Dance Ltd.

Deck voiced Amanda Ripley in video game Alien: Isolation, which also starred Sigourney Weaver and the cast of Ridley Scott's original film. Alien: Romulus, directed by Fede Álvarez, drew significant inspiration from Alien: Isolation. Later, she reprised the role in Alien: Blackout. She is rumoured to return to her role as Amanda Ripley in Alien Isolation 2 which is in early development by Creative Assembly. She also starred in a film adaptation of August Strindberg's play Creditors, directed by Ben Cura, playing writer Chloe Fleury, as well as being a producer on the film. In 2015, she played the lead female character in British horror film The Ghost Writer, due for release in 2016.

In 2018, she played murder victim Mahalia Geary in BBC2's adaptation of China Miéville's The City & The City. In 2020, she played CIA agent Jenna Bragg on season 8 of Homeland.

== Filmography ==
=== Actor ===
Year	Title	Role	Notes
2009	In love With a Nun	Jill	Short
2012	Les Misérables	Turning Woman 6	
2013	The Counselor	Watching Girl	
2013	The Devil's Violinist	Charlotte Watson	
2014	Mr Selfridge	Mabel Normand	Series 2, episode 8
2014	The Lovers	Allie	
2016	Creditors	Chloe Fleury	
2016	The Crown	Jean Wallop	Season 1, episode 9
2017	Instrument of War	Anne Cline	
2020	Homeland	Jenna Bragg	
2022	All The Light We Cannot See	Sandrina	

=== Producer ===
Year	Title	Notes
2016	Creditors	

=== Voice work ===
Year	Title	Role	Notes
2013	Strike Suit Zero	Grace Reynolds	Main character
2014	Alien: Isolation	Amanda Ripley	Main character
2014	Carol	Therese Belivet	Main character
2014	Strike Suit Zero: Director's Cut	Grace Reynolds	Main character
2015	SOMA	Sarah Lindwall	
2015	Star Wars Battlefront		
2016	Alien: Out of the Shadows	Kasyanov	
2016	Hitman		
2016	Quantum Break		
2017	Batman: Arkham VR	Martha Wayne	
2017	Tom Clancy's Ghost Recon: Wildlands	Nomad (Female)	Main character
2018	A Way Out	Linda Caruso	
2019	Alien: Blackout	Amanda Ripley	

=== Web ===
Year	Title	Role	Notes
2019	Alien: Isolation – The Digital Series	Amanda Ripley / Ellen Ripley (voices)	7 episodes (as Amanda), Episodes 6 & 7 (as Ellen)
