= Sallie Harmsen =

Dutch actress (born 1989)

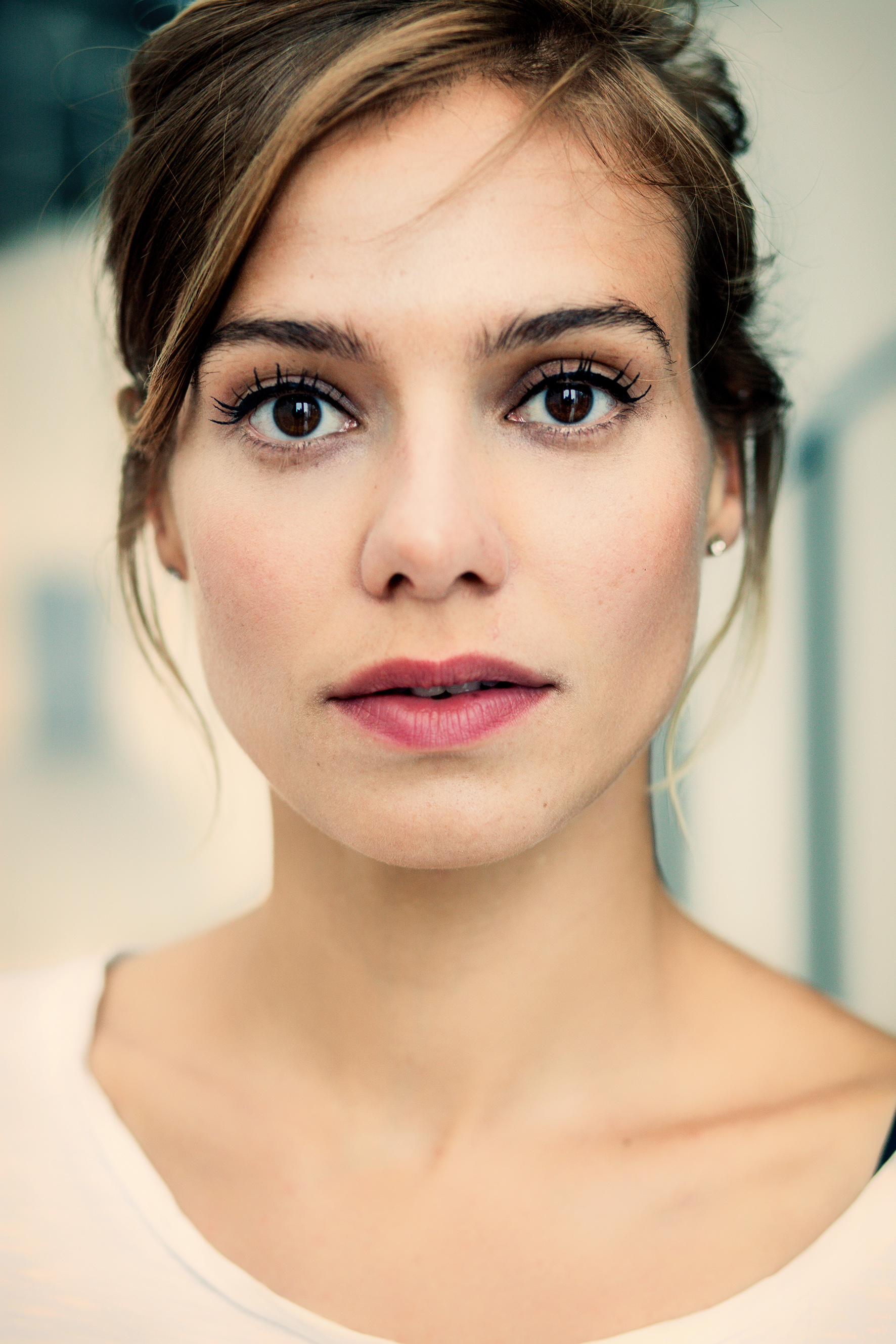
- Harmsen in 2018
- Born: May 2, 1989 (age 37); Amsterdam, Netherlands
- Occupation: Actress
- Years active: 2004–present

Sallie Harmsen (born May 2, 1989) is a Dutch actress having had roles in In Real Life for which she won Golden Calf for Best Actress at the Netherlands Film Festival 2008. Harmsen appeared in De Geheimen van Barslet Golden Calf for Best Actress in a TV drama in 2012. She has been recognised for her work in The Heineken Kidnapping (2011), Polleke, Vrijdag, and Tasso (2014-2015), Accused (Lucia de B.) (2014), and Moloch (2022).

== Career ==
Sallie Harmsen was born May 2, 1989. As an actress she achieved notoriety for her role as Simone in In Real Life, for which she won Golden Calf for Best Actress at the Netherlands Film Festival 2008.

In 2015 it was announced that Harmsen would be co-starring with Robert de Hoog in a television series based on the American outlaws Bonnie and Clyde. Harmsen portrayed the female replicant that was 'born' in the 2017 film Blade Runner 2049.

== Filmography ==
=== Film ===
- Guernsey (2005, as Buurmeisje)
- Winky's Horse (2005, as Sofie)
- The Making Of (2007, as Zusje)
- Where Is Winky's Horse? (2007, as Sofie)
- The Muse (2007)
- In Real Life (2008, as Simone)
- The Aviatrix of Kazbek (2010, as Kaat)
- Sterke verhalen (2010, as Sanne)
- Loft (2010, as Sarah Lunter)
- Pizza Maffia (2011, as Alice)
- The Heineken Kidnapping (2011, as Lisa)
- Bowy is inside (2012, as Sarah)
- Tricked (2012, as Nadja)
- Kenau (2014, as Kathelijne)
- Accused (2014, as Judith Jansen)
- Het mooiste wat er is (2015, as Dominique)
- Blade Runner 2049 (2017, as Replicant)
- The Postcard Killings (2020, as Nienke Holl)
- Mitra (2021, as Clara)
- Moloch (2022, as Betriek)
- Sea of Time, (2022, as Johanna)
- Noise, (2023, as Liv)
- The Wonder Weeks, (2023, as Anne)
- Line of Fire (2023, as Mirjam van den Hoven)
- Het boek van alle dingen (2024, as Mother)
- The Balloonist (2025, as Gaby)

=== Television ===
- Snacken (2004, as Sanne - TV film)
- Flikken Maastricht (2008, 1 episode, as Sanne Richters)
- Alex in Amsterdam (2009, as Lotte - TV short)
- Hart tegen Hard (2011, 1 episode, as Brenda Freriks)
- De geheimen van Barslet (2011, 5 episodes, as Manon de Vries)
- Uncle Hank (2012, as Sophie - TV film)
- Over (2012, as Emma - TV film)
- Het Sinterklaasjournaal (2014, 1 episode, as Jufvrouw)
- Heirs of the Night (2019, as Tonka)
- Devils (2020)
- 12 12 12 (2026)

=== Short film ===
- Brommermeisjes (2005, as Kiki)
- Het beloofde pand (2010, as Julie)
- "Cesqeaux & San Holo - Who Am I [Official Music Video]" (2016 as Denise)

== Theater ==
- Komt u maar (2010)
- Breaking The News (2012)
- Midsummer Night's Dream (2012)
- The Stone Bridal Bed (2013)
- The Wannsee Conference (2013)
- Vrijdag (2014, as Christiane)
- Tasso (2014, as Eleonore)
- Elektra (2014, as Chrysothemis)
- Polleke (2015, as Polleke)
- Three Sisters (2015, as Irina)

== Awards and nominations ==
Year	Award	Category	Nominated work	Result	Ref.
2008	Netherlands Film Festival	Golden Calf - Best Actress in a Film	In Real Life	Nominated	
2012	Netherlands Film Festival	Golden Calf - Best Actress in a TV Drama	De geheimen van Barslet	Nominated	
2012	Rembrandt Awards	Best Dutch Actress	The Heineken Kidnapping	Nominated	
2015	De Guido de Moorprijs		Polleke, Vrijdag, and Tasso	Won	
2016	Milan Film Festival	Best Acting	Accused (Lucia de B.)	Nominated	
2022	Anatomy Crime and Horror Film Festival	Jury Prize - Best Actress - All Categories	Moloch	Won	
