= Eric Vloeimans =

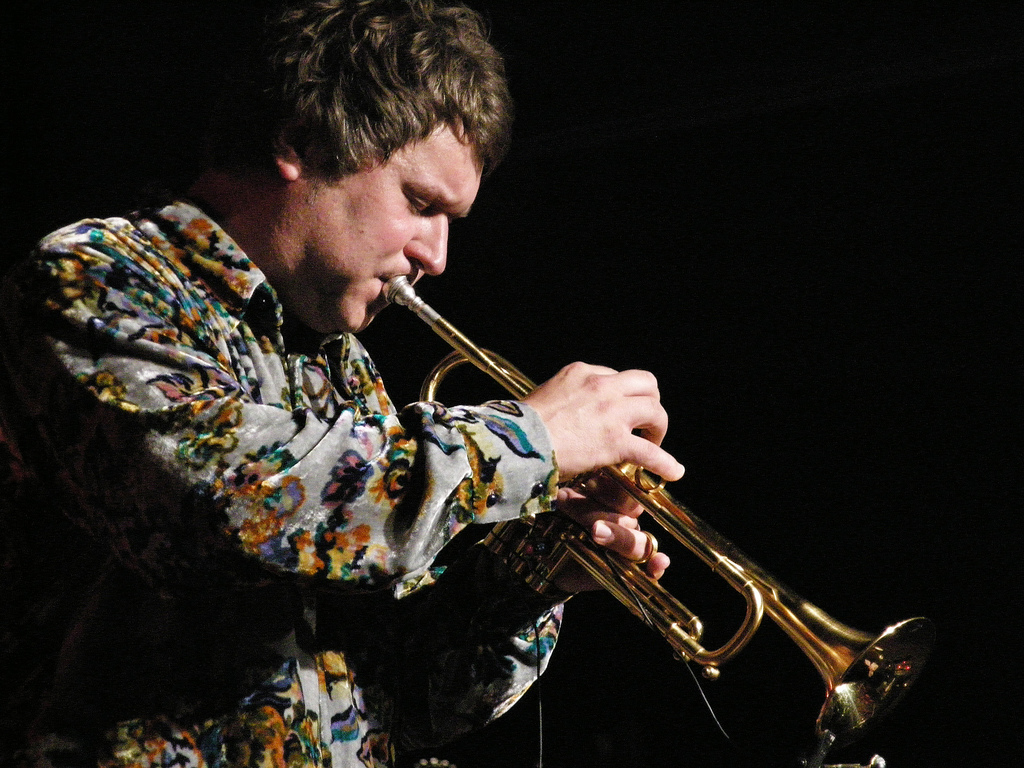
- Vloeimans performing in July 2007

Background information
- Born: 24 March 1963 (age 62); Huizen, North Holland, Netherlands
- Genres: Jazz
- Occupations: Musician; songwriter; record producer
- Instrument: Trumpet
- Years active: 1990–present
- Labels: Challenge
- Website: ericvloeimans.com

Eric Vloeimans (Dutch pronunciation: [ˈeːrɪk ˈfluimɑns]; born 24 March 1963) is a Dutch musician, songwriter, and record producer.

== Biography ==
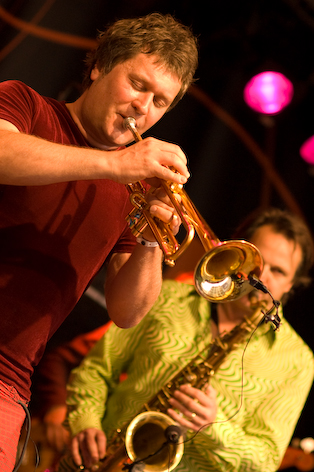
Vloeimans performing in 2006

Although he studied classical music as a child, he became interested in jazz at the Rotterdam Academy of Music. After graduating in 1988, he moved to New York City and studied trumpet with Donald Byrd. He was a member of big bands led by Mercer Ellington and Frank Foster. In the 1990s, he recorded the album Bitches and Fairy Tales (1999) with Marc Johnson, Joey Baron, and John Taylor. Vloeimans has also worked with Kinan Azmeh, Michiel Borstlap, Lars Danielsson, Jimmy Haslip, Joe LaBarbera, Nguyên Lê, Ernst Reijseger, and Bugge Wesseltoft.

== Awards and honors ==
- Edison Award, Bitches and Fairy Tales, 1999
- Boy Edgar Award, Umai, 2001
- Bird Award, Best Jazz Trumpeter, 2002
- Gouden Nutcracker, Dutch Jazz Album, Heavensabove, 2011

== Discography ==
=== As leader ===
- No Realistics (Art in Jazz, 1992)
- First Floor (Challenge, 1994)
- Bestiarium (Challenge, 1996)
- Bitches and Fairy Tales (Challenge, 1998)
- Zwart wit Bimhuis Live (BV Haast, 1999)
- Umai (Challenge, 2000)
- Brutto Gusto (Challenge, 2002)
- Hidden History (Challenge, 2003)
- Boompetit (Challenge, 2004)
- Nocturnal Ghost Songs (Basta, 2005)
- Summersault (Challenge, 2006)
- The Compositions of Eric Dolphy with Alex Coke, Willem Breuker (BV Haast, 2006)
- Gatecrashin' (Challenge, 2007)
- Hyper (Challenge, 2008)
- Live at Yoshi's (Challenge, 2009)
- Heavens Above! (Challenge, 2009)
- Live at the Concertgebouw with Florian Weber (Challenge, 2011)
- North Sea Jazz Legendary Concerts (Bob City, 2013)
- Pessoa (Coast to Coast 2013)
- Party Animals (V-Flow, 2020)

=== As sideman ===
With Michel Banabila

- Urban Jazz Scapes (Javaanse Jongens, 2003)
- Music for Viola and Electronics II (Tapu, 2015)
- New Land (Tapu, 2017)

With Michiel Borstlap

- The Sextet Live! (Challenge, 1995)
- Body Acoustic (EmArcy 1999)
- Liveline (EmArcy, 2000)

With Martin Fondse

- Upperground (BV Haast, 1998)
- Ere Ibeji (BV Haast, 2001)
- Fragrant Moondrops (Basta, 2009)
- Testimoni (Basta, 2012)

With others

- Jan Akkerman, Minor Details (Digimode, 2011)
- Jan Akkerman, North Sea Jazz Legendary Concerts (Bob City, 2013)
- Kinan Azmeh, Jeroen Van Vliet, Eric Vloeimans' Levanter (V-Flow, 2018)
- Bob Brookmeyer, Waltzing With Zoe (Challenge, 2001)
- Calefax, On the Spot (Challenge, 2013)
- Pierre Courbois, Live in Germany (A Records, 1996)
- Pierre Courbois, Reouverture (A Records, 1996)
- Freek de Jonge, Zonde (V2, 2013)
- Rob de Nijs, Vanaf Vandaag (Capitol, 2004)
- Chris Hinze, Senang (Keytone, 1996)
- Brigitte Kaandorp, Thuis (Doek Op 2015)
- Jacek Kochan, Another Blowfish (Not Two, 2002)
- Michael Moore, Osiris (Ramboy, 2006)
- Michael Moore, Rotterdam (Ramboy, 2011)
- Enrico Pieranunzi, Alone Together (Challenge, 2001)
- Ntjam Rosie, The One (Gentle Daze, 2015)
- Florian Ross, Lilacs and Laughter (Naxos, 2000)
- Sandhya Sanjana, Random Access Melody (LopLop, 2009)
- Jarmo Savolainen, Grand Style (A Records, 2000)
- Jarmo Savolainen, Times Like These (A Records, 2002)
- Armin van Buuren, Embrace (Armada, 2015)
- Jasper van 't Hof, Ballads of Timbuktu (Jaro Medien, 2002)
- Jasper van 't Hof, NeverNeverLand (Jaro Medien, 2005)
