= Good Favour =

2017 film

- Directed by: Rebecca Daly
- Written by: Rebecca Daly
- Starring: Alexandre Willaume
- Cinematography: Tibor Dingelstad
- Release dates: 8 September 2017 (TIFF); 9 November 2018 (Ireland)
- Countries: Ireland; Belgium; Denmark; Netherlands
- Language: English

Good Favour is a 2017 Irish-Belgian-Danish-Dutch drama film directed by Rebecca Daly. It was screened in the Contemporary World Cinema section at the 2017 Toronto International Film Festival.

== Plot ==
A wounded teenager stumbles into an isolated Catholic village and is welcomed with open arms as his intentions are gradually revealed.

== Cast ==
- Alexandre Willaume as Hans
- Clara Rugaard as Shosanna
- Victoria Mayer as Maria
- Vincent Romeo as Tom

== Accolades ==
Good Favour won the Audience Award, National Competition, at the 2019 Brussels International Film Festival (BRIFF).
