= Moloch (2022 film) =

- Directed by: Nico van den Brink
- Screenplay by: Nico van den Brink; Daan Bakker
- Produced by: Sabine Brian; Ronald Versteeg
- Starring: Sallie Harmsen; Alexandre Willaume
- Cinematography: Emo Weemhoff
- Edited by: Xander Nijsten
- Music by: Ella van der Woude
- Production company: NL Film
- Distributed by: XYZ Films
- Release date: 19 May 2022 (Netherlands)
- Running time: 99 minutes
- Country: Netherlands
- Languages: Dutch; English; Romanian

Moloch is a 2022 Dutch folk horror film directed by Nico van den Brink, starring Sallie Harmsen and Alexandre Willaume.

== Plot ==
The film focuses on 38 year old Betriek (Sallie Harmsen), who lives with her family in a house on edge of a peat bog in north Netherlands. The family's relatively peaceful existence is shattered one night when a mysterious stranger attacks the house, setting off a string of unexplained events that Betriek attempts to unravel about the mystery of the stranger. All the while, an ancient evil lurks deep within the bog.

== Cast ==
- Sallie Harmsen as Betriek
  - Isabel Merbis as young Betriek
- Alexandre Willaume as Jonas
- Anneke Blok as Elske, Betriek's mother
  - Hansje van Welbergan as young Elske
- Ad van Kempen as Ton
- Noor van der Velden as Hannah, Betriek's daughter
- Markoesa Hamer as Sonja
- Edon Rizvanolli as Radu
- Jack Wouterse as Hans
- Phi Nguyen as Lennard
- Willemijn Kressenhof as Dr. Mensinck
- Fred Goessens as Roelof, Betriek's father

== Release ==
The film was released in theatres in the Netherlands on 19 May 2022.

== Reception ==
On review aggregation website Rotten Tomatoes, the film has an approval rating of 88% based on 16 reviews. Kurt Halfyard of ScreenAnarchy called the film a "bonafide gem of a horror movie" and van den Brink a "filmmaker to keep a very close eye on." Kevin Toma of de Volkskrant rated the film 4 stars out of 5. Whang Yee Ling of The Straits Times rated the film 3 stars out of 5, calling it a "well-crafted exercise in dread" and wrote that van den Brink "turns an over-familiar tale into a uniquely local folk horror."

Roosje van der Kamp of filmkrant wrote a mixed review of the film. Jon Mendelsohn of Comic Book Resources wrote that while the film "plays with interesting ideas and spends time with its characters", it "can't seem to blend everything together into a concrete whole" and "final product is a bit unsatisfying."
