= The Head (2020 TV series) =

Spanish television series

- Genre: Mystery; Thriller
- Created by: David Pastor; Àlex Pastor; David Troncoso
- Directed by: Jorge Dorado
- Starring: John Lynch; Katharine O'Donnelly; Alexandre Willaume; Richard Sammel; Tomohisa Yamashita; Laura Bach; Álvaro Morte; Olivia Morris; Moe Dunford; Josefin Neldén; Hovik Keuchkerian; Sota Fukushi
- Countries of origin: Spain; Japan
- Original languages: English; Danish; Swedish; French
- No. of episodes: 18

Production
- Executive producers: Ran Tellem; Mariano Baselga; Laura Fernández Espeso; Javier Mendez; Bernat Elias
- Production locations: Tenerife; Canary Islands; Iceland
- Running time: 50+ minutes
- Production company: The Mediapro Studio

Original release
- Network: HBO Asia
- Release: 12 June 2020 – 24 January 2025

The Head is a Spanish-Japanese English-language psychological thriller television series directed by Jorge Dorado for HBO Asia and Hulu Japan. The first season, set in Antarctica, premiered on 12 June 2020. A second season premiered on 22 December 2022. A third and final season started airing on December 19, 2024.

== Premise ==
=== Season 1 ===
The first season is set at the Polaris VI international Antarctic research station. A small group of scientists, known as the "Winterers," remain at the station to maintain research during the six-month polar night. When the spring commander, Johan Berg (Alexandre Willaume), returns to the base, he discovers a scene of carnage: most of the team is dead, and Annika (Laura Bach), Johan's wife, is missing. The story unfolds through two timelines: Johan's investigation in the present and the harrowing flashbacks of the lone survivor, Maggie Mitchell (Katharine O'Donnelly), as she recounts the descent into paranoia and murder that occurred during the darkness.

=== Season 2 ===
The setting shifts to the Alexandria, a massive scientific freighter navigating the Point Nemo region of the Pacific Ocean—the point on Earth farthest from land. Dr. Arthur Wilde, having avoided the fallout of the Antarctica incident, leads a new team of researchers attempting to save the planet from climate change. The mission is jeopardized when a severed head is found on board, signaling the presence of a killer. The isolation of the open sea serves as a floating "locked-room" mystery where no one can escape.

=== Season 3 ===
The final season takes place in the Sahara Desert within a high-tech industrial oasis. The plot follows a specialized group of experts testing experimental atmospheric water generators. When a massive sandstorm hits, the facility is cut off from the outside world. As the body count rises, the narrative focuses on the final resolution of the psychological war between the primary antagonists of the series, exploring themes of corporate greed and the ultimate consequences of the events that began at Polaris VI.

== Cast and characters ==
=== Main ===
- John Lynch as Dr. Arthur Wilde (seasons 1-3), a famous biologist. 8 years prior to the events of the series, he and Annika discovered a bacterium that feeds on CO_{2}. On Polaris VI, he continues the research in order to fight climate change. Although he does not lead the research station, as head scientist he does have some authority over the staff. At first classified as missing, he is another survivor. He is a brilliant but manipulative narcissist whose unethical pursuit of a climate solution drives the conflict across all three locations.
- Katharine O'Donnelly as Dr. Maggie Mitchell (seasons 1-3), the station doctor during winter. She is new to Polaris VI with Aki and Heather, and becomes close to Aki. Upon their return, the summer team finds her hiding and afraid as one survivor next to two missing and seven dead team members. She tries to reconstruct the past events while being worn-out physically and mentally. The story she tells leads Johan's search for his wife. Initially appearing as a traumatized survivor, she is later revealed to be a vengeful and highly intelligent strategist hunting Arthur Wilde to the ends of the Earth.
- Olivia Morris as Rachel Russo (seasons 2–3), a marine biologist and the estranged daughter of Arthur Wilde. She joins the Alexandria in season 2 to reconcile with her father but becomes a vital player in the high-stakes human trials in the Sahara.

=== Season 1 ===
- Alexandre Willaume as Johan Berg (season 1), the station's summer commander. His wife Annika remains in the station during winter and is missing when Johan returns after six months, having lost communications for three weeks. He tries to figure out what happened and find his wife.
- Richard Sammel as Erik Osterland (season 1), the winter commander of Polaris VI. He has a military background and tries hard to keep the team safe and together. He has a relationship with Ebba, the station's nurse.
- Tomohisa Yamashita as Aki Kobayashi (main, season 1; guest, season 2), a young, ambitious biologist who works on his PhD. He admires Arthur Wilde and his work and is proud to work for him. Like Maggie and Heather, he is new at the station. Aki and Maggie are very close, and he's protective of her, even more so when the killings begin.
- Laura Bach as Annika Lundqvist (season 1), an ambitious and very dedicated biologist who discovered the bacterium together with Arthur. She remained at Polaris VI because she is determined to work on this crucial research and be acknowledged as well in a world very dominated by men. Upon Johan's return, Annika is missing, and he tries hard to find her.
- Álvaro Morte as Ramón Lazaro (season 1), the station cook who has repeatedly returned to the station for many years now. He gets along with the crew, but can also become choleric and aggressive.

=== Season 2 ===
- Moe Dunford as Alec Kurtz, a security expert on the Alexandria who finds himself outmatched by the psychological warfare occurring on the ship.
- Josefin Neldén as Amy, a dedicated scientist working under Wilde who begins to suspect the true nature of the research and the identity of the killer.
- Hovik Keuchkerian as Charlie, the ship's head of security. A former professional boxer, he uses his physical presence and intuition to hunt the murderer on board.
- Sota Fukushi as Yuto Nakajima, a computer specialist from Japan responsible for the freighter's technical infrastructure and data security.

=== Season 3 ===
- Ben Cura as Liam Ruddock (main season 3, guest season 2).
- Stanley Weber as Pierre.
- Clara Galle as Alba.
- Riko Nakazono as Keiko.
- Godehard Giese as Horst.
- Johnny Grodan as Joe.
- Lochlann Ó Mearáin as Sean.

=== Supporting and recurring ===
- Chris Reilly as Nils Hedlund (season 1), the station's Technician who is shown as conflicted, drinking a lot and more and more affected by polar T_{3} syndrome.
- Tom Lawrence as Miles Porter, the communications officer and one of the longest serving staff at Polaris VI.
- Sandra Andreis as Ebba Ullman (season 1), the station nurse who has spent many winters on Polaris VI already. She misses her kids and her family, but also has an affair with Erik, which is straining on her.
- Amelia Hoy as Heather Blake (season 1), a Computer Officer from Texas who is very athletic and competitive. She is the third newbie on the station, along with Maggie and Aki.
- Mónica López as Astrid Casado (season 1)
- Hannes Fohlin as Gus (season 1)
- Andreas Rothlin as Dr. Micke Karlsson (season 1)
- Philippe Jacq as Damian Fowles (season 1)
- Nora Rios as Gloria (season 2), a crew member and researcher on the Alexandria.
- Enrique Arce as Óscar (season 2), a cynical technician on the cargo ship.
- Olwen Fouéré as Lauren (season 2 and 3), a mysterious figure with deep ties to the corporate interests funding Wilde's research.
- Lolu Ajayi as Jamal, part of the facility's security.

== Production ==
The series was shot in a set in Tenerife, in the Canary Islands, whereas outdoor scenes were shot in Iceland.

In October 2021, The Mediapro Studio (detached from HBO Asia and Hulu Japan) reported that they were preparing a second season set in a container ship, directed by Jorge Dorado and written by Mariano Baselga (season 1 executive producer) and Jordi Galceran, with cinematography by David Acereto, with Laura Fernández Espeso, Javier Mendez and Bernat Elias credited as executive producers.

In October 2023 it was announced that the producers were working on a third season, which was officially announced and confirmed as the last in December. Shooting lasted from mid-December to late January 2024.

== International broadcast ==
The series aired on Hulu Japan, HBO Asia, Canal+, AXN Portugal, and Amazon Video in the summer season 2020.

In the United States, the series was streamed on HBO Max from 4 February 2021, as a "Max Original".

In the UK, Ireland, Germany, Austria, Switzerland and Luxembourg, streaming started on Starzplay on February 7, 2021. In Brazil, it streamed exclusively on Globoplay.

In India, the series is streaming on Hotstar under "HBO Original" label.

In Australia, the series is available to stream on SBS On Demand
