= Sandhya Sanjana =

- Born: Mumbai, India
- Genres: Jazz fusion, jazz, Indian classical
- Occupation: Singer
- Years active: 1980–present
- Website: sandhyasanjana.com

Sandhya Sanjana (Hindi: संध्या) is a singer from Mumbai, India. She is one of the first Indian singers to have experimented with combining Indian classical vocals with contemporary western styles. Her career began at a young age and she has appeared on over 30 albums of various genres.

== Life ==
=== Journey into fusion ===
She sang with rock bands in Bombay, New Delhi, and Kolkata. When she met Dinshah Sanjana, he had studied classical piano and was entering the world of Indian music by studying the flute. He switched to tabla to accompany her. They went on to form their fusion group Divya.

=== Embarking on a solo career ===
In 1998, Sandhya and Dinshah separated. In 1999, she married a Dutch man, moved to the Netherlands, and embarked on her solo career. She recorded her Nava Rasa suite with Heiko Dijker on tabla and Matthieu Safatly on prepared cello. She toured the Netherlands and Germany with this trio, while sometimes adding a dancer to the group. In London, she performed her Nava Rasa song cycle with Renga of the London Philharmonic Orchestra at St. James's Church in Piccadilly and at the Southbank Centre. Alice Coltrane invited her to do a solo performance at the John Coltrane festival for a fund raising concert.

She is a member of Ramesh Shotham's Madras Special, a band that combines South Indian music and jazz. With this band, she performed in Morocco, Taiwan, Romania, Hungary, London, Germany and the Netherlands. She appeared on their albums Madras Special and Urban Folklore.

She has been a featured member of Omri Hason's Kadim and toured Switzerland, Luxembourg, the Netherlands, and Germany with this band. She appeared on two albums with Kadim – the eponymous debut album and Shati.

She was one of the musicians on mp3.com who made web collaborations. During this period, she met Rom di Prisco who writes soundtracks for video games. He used Sanjana's voice on Unreal Tournament 3.

She has worked with Zoltan Lantos

== Discography ==
=== As vocalist/member ===
- Divya: Madras Cafe (CBS, 1987)
- Divya: Kumbhamela (Earth Beat, 1998)
- Dinshah & Sandhya Sanjana: Ramayana - a Journey (Channel Four Television, 1997)
- Madras Special (Permission Music, 2002)
- Madras Special: Urban Folklore (Double Moon, 2006)
- Omri Hason: Kadim (Permission, 2003)
- Omri Hason: Shati (Double Moon, 2008)
- Prem Joshua: Shiva Moon (Music Today, 2003)
- Prem Joshua: Yatri (White Swan, 2006)
- Prem Joshua: Taranga (White Swan, 2006)
- Praful: Pyramic in your Backyard (Therapy Recordings, 2006)
- Praful: Remixed + 2 (Therapy, 2006)
- Chris Hinze Combination: Back on the Map (Keytone, 2004)
- Masaladosa: Electro World Curry (Masalasound, 2008)
- Sandhya Sanjana: Random Access Melody (Loplop, 2009)

=== As guest ===
- Alice Coltrane: Glorious Chants (Avatar Book Institute, 1995)
- Mynta: Indian Times (Intuition, 1997)
- Susheela Raman: Salt Rain (Narada, 2001)
- Susheela Raman: Love Trap (Narada, 2003)
- Indofunk: The Basement Sessions (Saraswati, 2002)
- Bahramji & Maneesh De Moor: Call of the Mystic (Blue Flame, 2005)
- Maneesh de Moor: Sadhana (Sounds True, 2006)
- Unreal Tournament 3 The Soundtrack (Sumthing Else MusicWorks, 2007)
- Michel Banabila: Traces (Tapu, 2007)
- Michel Banabila: Precious Images (Steamin' Soundworks, 2008)

== Newspaper articles in the de Volkskrant ==
- Zoltan Lantos laat nieuwe snaren resoneren (Dutch), Zoltan Lantos allows new strings to resonate (English)
- Wereldmuziek (Dutch), World (English)
- Dialoog tussen piano en oeroude kleipot (Dutch), Dialogue between piano and ancient clay pot (English)
- Indiase klassieke muziek met een bluesy groove (Dutch), Indian classical music with a bluesy groove(English)
