= Comes a Bright Day =

2012 film

- Directed by: Simon Aboud
- Written by: Simon Aboud
- Produced by: Christine Alderson
- Starring: Craig Roberts; Imogen Poots; Timothy Spall; Kevin McKidd
- Cinematography: John Lynch
- Edited by: Gavin Buckley
- Production companies: IpsoFacto Films; Matador Pictures; Cinema Six; Regent Capitol; Smudge Films
- Release dates: 12 February 2012 (Berlin International Film Festival); 13 July 2012 (United Kingdom)
- Running time: 91 min.
- Country: United Kingdom
- Language: English

Comes a Bright Day is a 2012 British film written and directed by Simon Aboud, and starring Craig Roberts, Imogen Poots, Kevin McKidd and Timothy Spall. Comes a Bright Day is Aboud's directorial debut. The film is a mix of genres: a darkly comic thriller, involving a romance set within a heist, and a story about searching for the hidden gems that make life infinitely richer.

== Plot ==
Sam Smith, a bright, ambitious, handsome bellboy at a five-star hotel, has big dreams of running his own restaurant with his childhood friend. On a seemingly ordinary day, he suddenly finds himself in a life-or-death hostage situation with the radiantly beautiful Mary and her spirited elderly boss Charlie while running an errand at one of London's most exclusive jewellers. Against the backdrop of an armed jewel robbery that goes badly wrong, hostages Sam and Mary discover their true feelings for each other when flung together by deadly circumstance. At the conclusion of the situation, Charlie grants Sam his wish of running a restaurant by proposing a partnership with him. Mary tells her boss that she changed her plans of moving to Australia, and asks Sam to take her to a concert.

== Production ==
Principal photography began on 16 May 2011, on location around Mayfair and at Elstree Studios near London. Comes a Bright Day was financed by Matador Pictures, Regent Capital and Lost Tribe Productions.

British fashion designer Sir Paul Smith dressed the principal cast for the film, and photographed Imogen Poots for Japanese magazine Numéro on set.

== Cast ==
- Craig Roberts as Sam Smith
- Imogen Poots as Mary Bright
- Kevin McKidd as Cameron
- Timothy Spall as Charlie
- Geoff Bell as John Morgan
- Josef Altin as Clegg
- Anthony Welsh as Elliot
- Ben Cura as Mr Sullivan
- Andrew Leung as Andrews

== Soundtrack ==
The Foo Fighters gave special permission for the use of their track "My Hero" on the soundtrack of the film.

The title track is "222" by Paul McCartney, from the special edition of the album Memory Almost Full and appears briefly in the trailer and the main film and in full over the end credits.

Europe's largest printed music publisher Music Sales supervised the music for the film.
