= Creditors (play) =

Play written by A. Strindberg

- Original language: Swedish, Danish
- Written by: August Strindberg
- Characters: Tekla, a writer Adolf, her husband, a painter Gustav, her former husband, a teacher Two Ladies; A Porter
- Genre: Naturalistic tragicomedy
- Setting: A drawing room in a summer hotel by the sea

Premiere
- Date: 9 March 1889
- Place: Dagmar Theatre, Copenhagen

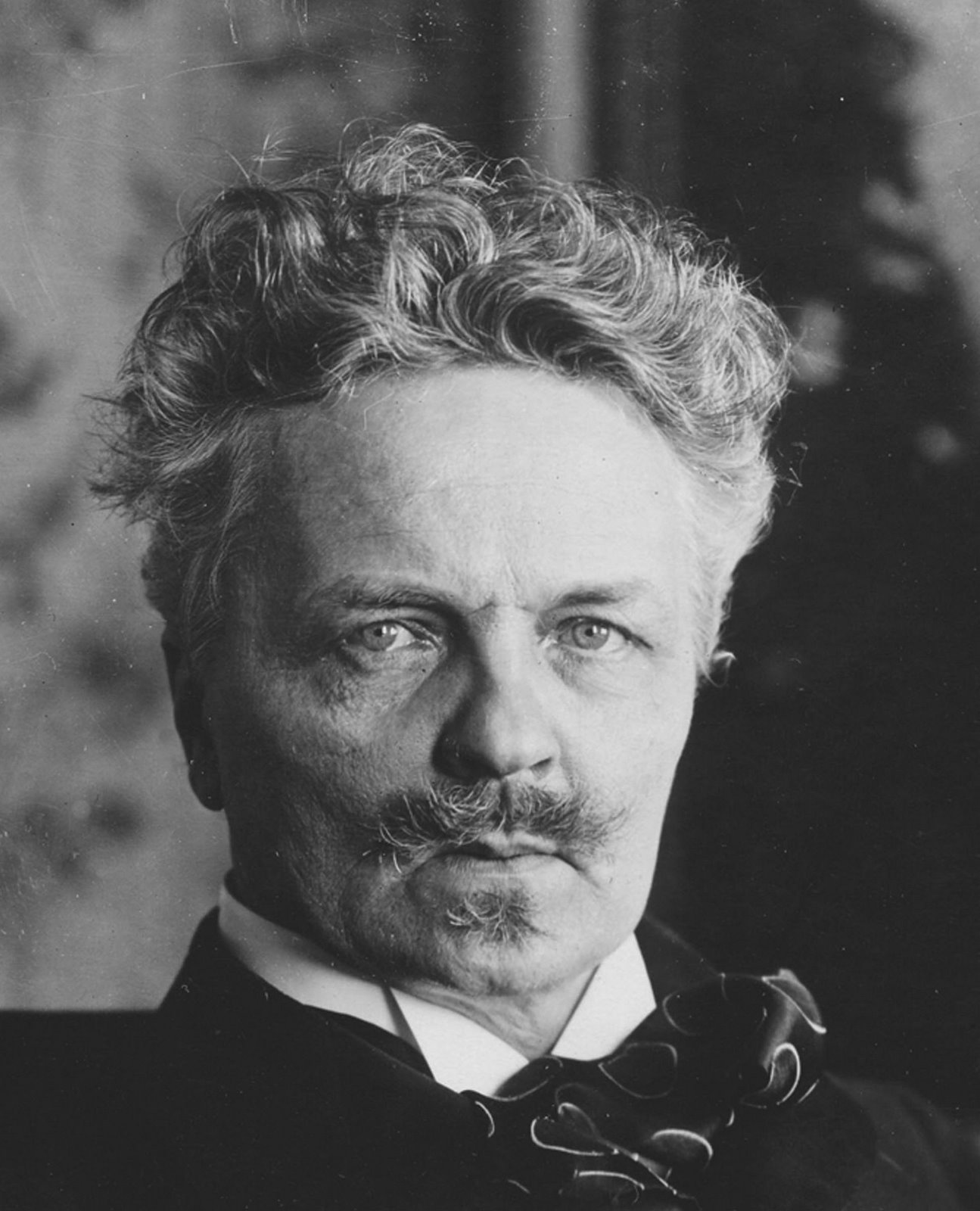
August Strindberg

Creditors (Swedish: Fordringsägare) is a naturalistic tragicomedy by the Swedish playwright August Strindberg. It was written in Swedish during August and September 1888 in Denmark. It was first published in Danish in February 1889 and appeared in Swedish in 1890. It premiered at the Dagmar Theatre in Copenhagen in March 1889. It is seen as one of Strindberg's most powerful plays. Strindberg himself, writing in 1892, described it as his "most mature work."

== Characters ==
- Adolph – an artist
- Tekla – a novelist, Adolph's wife
- Gustav – a teacher, Tekla's former husband

== Plot ==
This three-character play takes place in a parlor adjoined to a room in a seaside resort hotel. It begins with Adolph, an artist, sculpting a small nude female figure. With him is Adolph's new friend, Gustav, who has been visiting for a week and inciting changes in Adolph's life: Adolph was a painter, until Gustav persuaded him to be a sculptor. Adolph's wife, Tekla, has been away for the past week; when she parted, Adolph upset her by calling her an "old flirt" and suggesting that she was too old to play the coquette. Adolph credited his wife, Tekla, for educating him, but as he opens up to Gustav about his marriage, he starts changing his mind about how happy he is. Adolph's fears boil up at one point, causing him to become, according to Gustav, almost epileptic. The audience begins to suspect that Gustav is, in fact, Tekla's ex-husband, about whom the two men speak constantly. After leaving her first husband Gustav, Tekla wrote a novel that was a roman a clef with the main character based on Gustav, there portrayed as an idiot. As she now approaches the hotel, Gustav suggests that he will hide in the next room and eavesdrop, while Adolph will attempt to apply his lessons on how to handle Tekla, and sound out his wife to see if she is unfaithful, and to see if she will seek revenge on Adolph for his unkind comment before she left.

Gustav exits, Tekla enters and is alone with Adolph. She is a charming and vivacious character, who flirts with her own husband – even though he has been convinced to resist her charms. They have fallen into the habit of calling themselves "brother and sister", because when she was being stolen away from her first husband, they both were attempting to feign a chaste relationship. Now she wants Adolph to call her "Pussy", because, she says, that might cause her to get up a "pretty little blush" for him, if he would like. Adolph becomes unpleasant, as he applies the ideas that he has been given by Gustav. Adolph also expresses his insecurities, and then, set off by a confused exchange, he storms out of the room in frustration.

Now Gustav, the ex-husband, re-enters. Gustav's manner has changed, and he is now seductively charming. He and his ex-wife bond very quickly. He tells Tekla that he has found someone else, which is not true. Tekla falls for Gustav's charms, and they both agree to meet for a tryst, as a way of saying "farewell". She suddenly realizes he was just playing her off, but it is too late. Adolph, who had heard all through the keyhole, has an off-stage epileptic seizure. Gustav crows in triumph over the revenge he has won over Tekla. As Gustav prepares to leave Tekla, the door opens and Adolph appears in the throes of an epileptic seizure and falls to the floor, dead. Tekla is distraught, and as she wails over her husband's body, Gustav's last line is: "Why, she must have loved him, too. Poor creature."

The word "creditor" is used by the three characters to refer to each of the other characters at different times during the course of the play.

== Premieres and historic productions ==
Creditors was first performed as part of a triple bill with Strindberg's one-act plays Pariah and The Stronger on 9 March 1889 at the Dagmar Theatre in Copenhagen, under the auspices of his newly formed Scandinavian Experimental Theatre. A week later, on 16 March, the production was staged in Malmö. Nathalia Larsen played Tekla, Gustav Wied played Adolf, and Hans Riber Hunderup played Gustav.

A new production was staged at the Swedish Theatre in Stockholm as part of a matinée double-bill with Simoon (a short, 15-minute play), which opened on 25 March 1890. Another production was staged at the Vasa Theatre in Stockholm, opening on 9 January 1906. Helge Wahlgren, an actor from the Intimate Theatre, toured a production of the play in the Swedish provinces in the autumn of 1909. The play was staged in Strelitz as well in the same year. In 1910, August Falck staged a production at the Intimate Theatre in Stockholm, which ran for 21 performances. As part of the celebrations of Strindberg's 63rd birthday, the play was staged in Helsingborg and Karlskoga. The Royal Dramatic Theatre staged it in 1915.

The play received its German premiere on 22 January 1893 at the Residenz Theatre in Berlin, under the direction of Sigismund Lautenburg. Rosa Bertens played Tekla, Rudolf Rittner played Adolf, and Josef Jarno played Gustav. It ran for 71 performances. At the end of March 1893, the production was invited for a gala performance in Vienna. In 1895, the Freie Bühne staged a private performance in Munich. In 1898, it was staged at the Schauspielhaus in Munich. In 1899, it was produced in Vienna. In the autumn of 1906, a production was staged in Altona. The play was also staged in Essen in the autumn of 1910. Another production was staged in Vienna in 1910 as part of a season of Strindberg's plays that also included Playing with Fire, Easter, and Christina. Josef Jarno, who had played Gustav in the Berlin premiere, directed.

Its French premiere opened on 21 June 1894, in a slightly abridged version at the Théâtre de l'Œuvre in Paris. Lugné-Poe directed and played Adolf. In response to the production's success, Strindberg wrote of his "sense of power... that in Paris, the intellectual centre of the world, 500 people are sitting in an auditorium silent as mice, stupid enough to expose their brains to my powers of suggestion." Lugné-Poe performed this production in Stockholm in October 1894 as part of his Scandinavian tour. Back in Paris, it was repeated at the Cercle St. Simon theatre on 10 December 1894.

The play was first produced in Britain by the Stage Society at the Prince's Theatre in London, in a translation by Ellie Schleussner, opening on 10 March 1912. Miriam Lewis played Tekla, Harcourt Williams played Adolf, and Guy Standing played Gustav. It was staged again in London in 1927 and 1952.

== Later and recent English-language productions ==
The 59 Theatre Company staged a translation by Michael Meyer at the Lyric Opera House in London, opening on 3 March 1959. It was directed by Casper Wrede and designed by Malcolm Pride. Mai Zetterling played Tekla, Lyndon Brook played Adolf, and Michael Gough played Gustav. The play was also staged at the Open Space Theatre in London, opening on 22 March 1972. This production was directed by Roger Swaine. Gemma Jones played Tekla, Sebastian Graham-Jones played Adolf, and Brian Cox played Gustaf. A production at the Almeida Theatre, which opened on 19 May 1986, was recorded and subsequently broadcast on Channel 4 on 16 March 1988. Suzanne Bertish played Tekla, Jonathan Kent played Adolf, and Ian McDiarmid played Gustaf. This production was directed by its cast members.

The play was produced by the Torquay Company at the Mermaid Theatre in New York, opening on 25 January 1962. Paul Shyre directed and David Johnston designed this production. Rae Allen played Tekla, James Ray played Adolf, and Donald Davis played Gustav. The play was later staged as part of a double-bill with The Stronger by The Public Theater at the Newman Theatre, New York, opening on 15 April 1977. Rip Torn directed and John Wright Stevens designed this production. Geraldine Page played Tekla, John Heard played Adolf, and Rip Torn played Gustav. It was also staged by the Classic Stage Company at its theatre in New York, opening on 27 January 1992. Carey Perloff directed and Donald Eastman designed this production, which featured a new translation by Paul Walsh. Caroline Lagerfelt played Tekla, Nestor Serrano played Adolf, and Zach Grenier played Gustav.

In 2010, a production directed by actor Alan Rickman was performed at Donmar Warehouse in London and the Brooklyn Academy of Music.

The play was produced in French, under the title Les Créanciers, by the Comédie-Française, in Paris, opening on 20 June 2018.

In 2023, Theater for the New City, in New York City, presented Strindberg Rep in a production adapted and directed by Robert Greer, which shifted Strindberg’s story to Montauk, New York. The cast included Natalie Menna as Tekla, Mike Roche as Gustav and Brad Fryman as Adolf.

In May 2025, Audible Theater and Together presented a new adaptation of the play by August Strindberg that was penned by Jen Silverman and directed by Ian Rickson. The cast featured Liev Schreiber, Maggie Siff, and Justice Smith. The play was part of a repertory season that included a production of Sexual Misconduct of the Middle Classes at the Minetta Lane Theatre.

In August 2025, a Chilean production of Acreedores (the Spanish title of Creditors) was staged at the Teatro Nacional Chileno in Santiago. This version was adapted and directed by Alexis Moreno and featured a cast including Francisco Reyes, Paloma Moreno, and Mario Horton. The production presented a contemporary interpretation of August Strindberg’s original play, exploring psychological and emotional dynamics through an intense triangular relationship. The run opened on 20 August 2025 and was part of the Teatro a Mil festival season, subsequently touring to other venues including a single performance in Viña del Mar.

Between 6 September and 11 October 2025, a version was performed at the Orange Tree Theatre in Richmond, London, starring Geraldine James (as Tekla), Charles Dance (as Gustaf), and Nicholas Farrell (as Adolf). In was also filmed and made available on the theatre's "OT On Screen" online stream on demand service between 14-17 October 2025 for watching until 17 October 2025.

== Film adaptations ==
In 1992, Estonian filmmaker Jaan Kolberg adapted the play into a film produced in Estonia by Arcadia films. Translated into Estonian as Võlausaldajad, the film starred Terje Pennie as Tekla, Arvo Kukumägi as Adolf, and Sulev Luik as Gustav.

In 2014, British actor and filmmaker Ben Cura adapted the play into a film produced in the UK and starring Christian McKay, Andrea Deck, Ben Cura, Tom Bateman and Simon Callow. Creditors, a film based on Strindberg's play, was announced to be premiered in 2015 at the Nordic International Film Festival in New York City where it was awarded the Honorable Mention in the Best Nordic Narrative Feature category. Latin Post film reviewer David Salazar called the film "A triumphant debut" while Blazing Minds film critic Susanne Hodder said "Creditors is an intelligent thought-provoking film which questions gender roles, female sexuality and male anxieties, making for an enjoyable and compelling watch".

== Comment in a letter regarding Ibsen ==
August Strindberg, after reading Henrik Ibsen's play Hedda Gabler in 1891, suggested in a private letter to a friend, that his own plays The Father and Creditors may have influenced or inspired Ibsen. Strindberg wrote: "Hedda Gabler is a bastard of Laura in The Father and Tekla in Creditors". Strindberg added: "You can see now that my seed has actually fallen into Ibsen's brain-pan–and grown! Now he carries my semen and is my uterus!"

== Sources ==
- Björkman, Edwin, trans. 1913. Creditors. By August Strindberg. In Plays. Second ser. New York: Scribner, 1926. 183–237.
- Carson, L, ed. (1913), Year Book, London: The Stage.
- Meyer, Michael (1987) [1985], Strindberg: A Biography, Lives, Oxford: Oxford UP, ISBN 0-19-281995-X.
- Strindberg, August (1991a), "Creditors", Plays, vol. Three, Michael Meyer, translator, London: Methuen, pp. 121–75, ISBN 0-413-64840-0.
- Meyer, Michael (1991b), Introduction in Strindberg, August (10 June 1991), Plays, vol. Three, London: Methuen, pp. 115–20, ISBN 0-413-64840-0.
- Ward, John. 1980. The Social and Religious Plays of Strindberg. London: Athlone. ISBN 0-485-11183-7.
- Williams, Raymond. 1952. Drama from Ibsen to Brecht. London: Hogarth, 1993. ISBN 0-7012-0793-0.
