= Heritage chicken =

Old chicken breeds

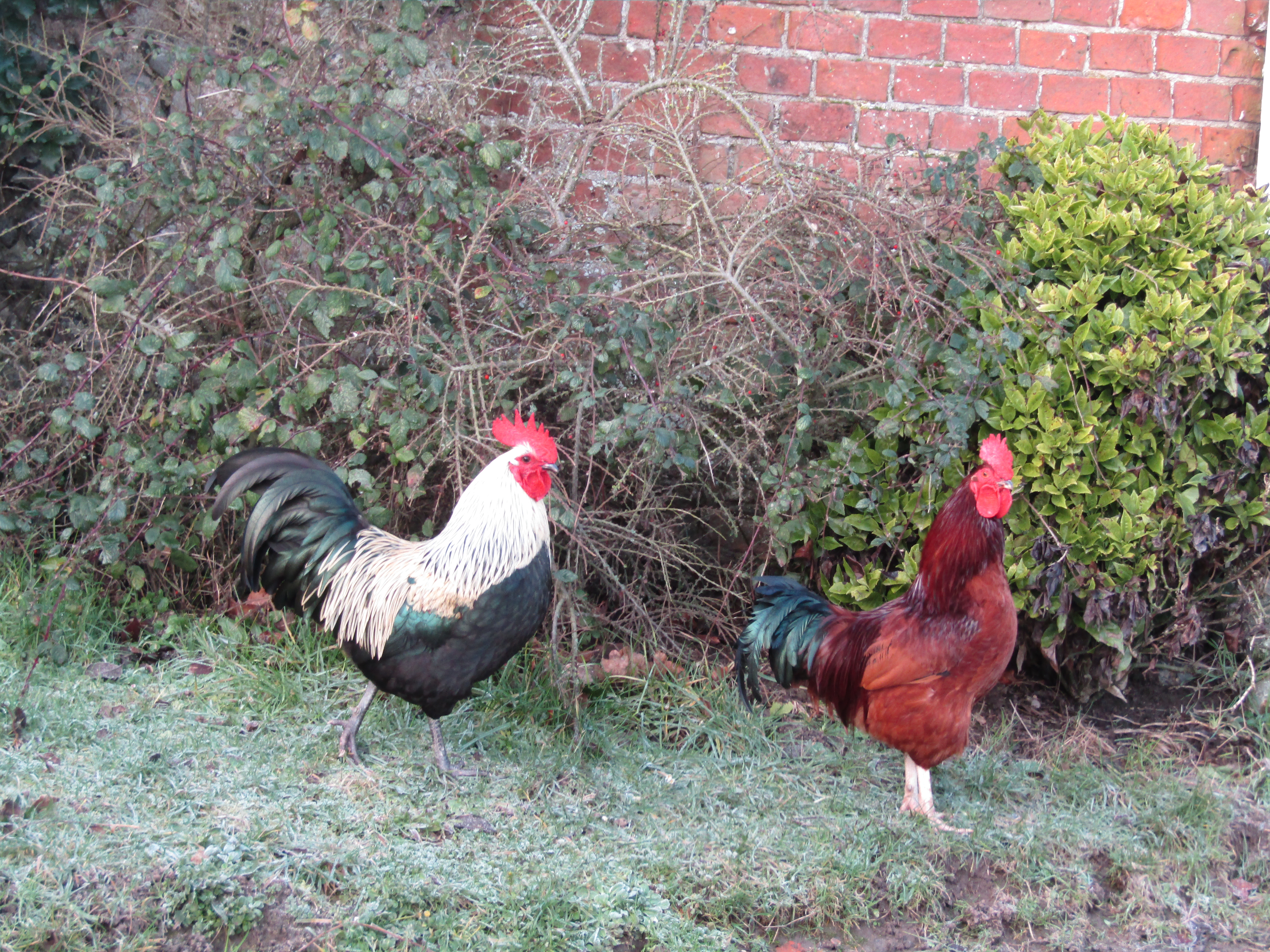
Dorking and Rhode Island Red chickens seen within the village of Trimingham, Norfolk, England.

Heritage chickens are chicken breeds that have existed for decades with relatively unchanged characteristics. They are not the same as modern commercial chickens, which are bred for rapid growth and efficiency. Heritage chickens are known for their ability to breed naturally, live long and healthy lives outdoors, and have a slower growth rate that allows their bodies to develop properly.

== Definition ==
The American Poultry Association recognizes breeds established before the middle of the 20th century as heritage. While the APA's recognition provides a convenient way to identify heritage breeds, however, it is not an absolute requirement. The Livestock Conservancy considers a breed heritage if it adheres to the following: it must be APA-recognized; it must be able to mate without human assistance; it must have a long and productive lifespan; and it must have a slow growth rate (specifically, reaching market weight at 16 weeks).

Other breeds, particularly those with similar characteristics and historical roots, can also be considered heritage chickens (e.g., Fayoumi). The terms "heirloom", "antique", and "old-timey" are often used synonymously with "heritage" in regards to chickens.

== See also ==
- Heritage turkey
- Heirloom plant
- Rare breed (agriculture)
