= Creditors (2015 film) =

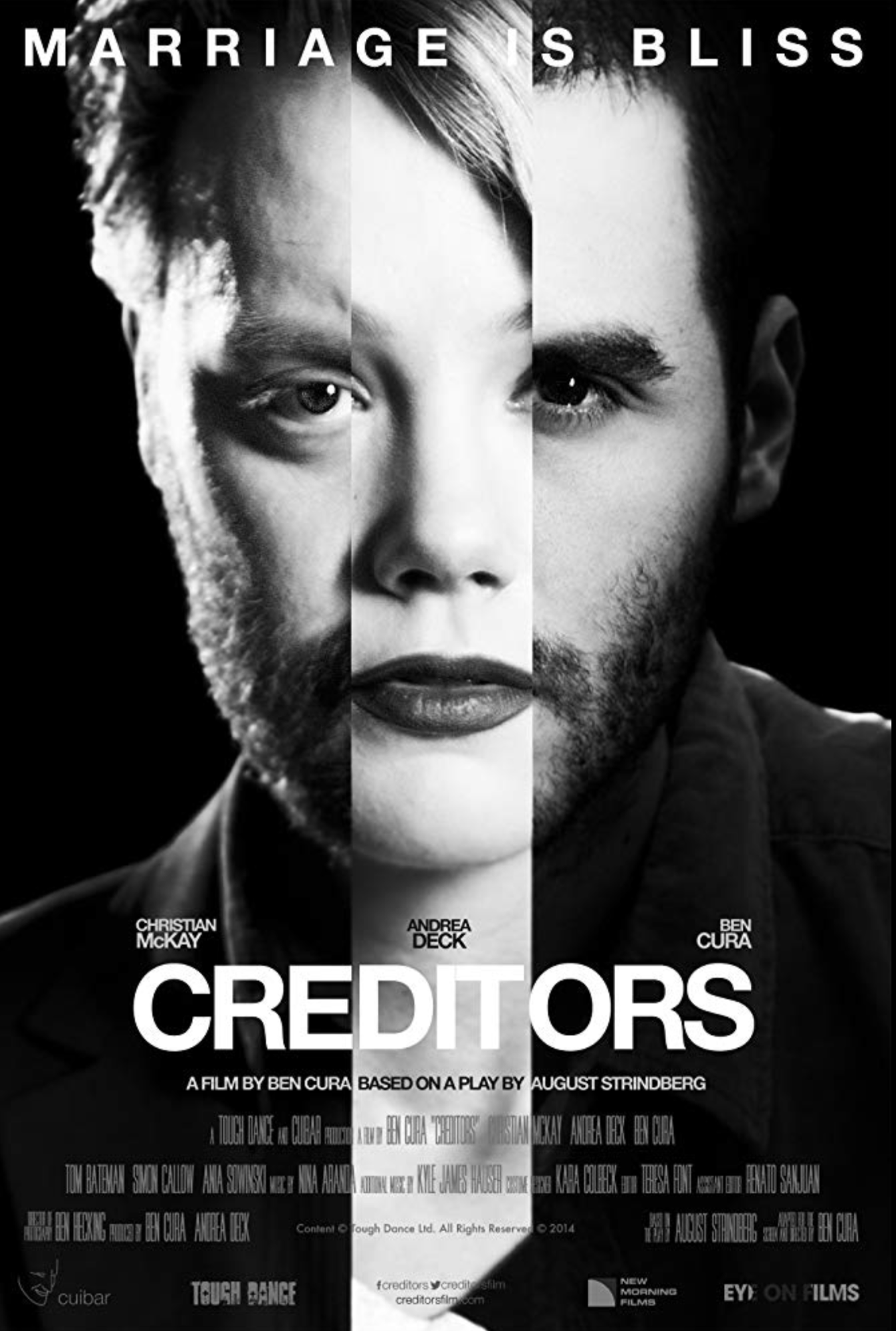
- Directed by: Ben Cura
- Screenplay by: Ben Cura
- Based on: Creditors by August Strindberg
- Produced by: Ben Cura; Andrea Deck
- Starring: Christian McKay; Andrea Deck; Ben Cura; Tom Bateman; Simon Callow
- Cinematography: Ben Hecking
- Edited by: Teresa Font
- Music by: Nina Aranda
- Production companies: Tough Dance; Cuibar Productions
- Release date: 31 October 2015 (NIFF)
- Running time: 81 minutes
- Country: United Kingdom
- Language: English

Creditors is a British drama film written and directed by Ben Cura, based on the play of the same title by August Strindberg and starring Christian McKay, Andrea Deck, Ben Cura, Tom Bateman and Simon Callow. Set in present-day England and Spain in this adaptation, it had its world premiere at the 2015 Nordic International Film Festival in New York City as part of the festival's Official Selection, where it was nominated for and was awarded the Honorable Mention for Best Nordic Narrative Feature. The film was a United Kingdom production by London-based company Tough Dance, founded by Ben Cura and Andrea Deck. Spanish company Cuibar Productions financed the film. Paris-based sales agents New Morning Films took on world sales of the film in early 2015. The film is actor Ben Cura's debut as a director, screenwriter, and producer.

== Summary ==
A love triangle is unraveled when a young painter is approached by an admirer who eases him into making sense of his relationship with his wife.

== Cast ==
- Christian McKay as Grant Pierce
- Andrea Deck as Chloe Fleury
- Ben Cura as Freddie Lynch
- Tom Bateman as Michael Redmane
- Simon Callow as John Allen

== Production ==
Ben Cura and Andrea Deck of London-based Tough Dance produced the film.

=== Filming ===
Filming began in September 2013. In a change of setting from the original Sweden of the play, the film was shot in Osea Island, Essex, England, and consequently, Madrid, Spain.

== Reception ==
Creditors world-premiered at the Nordic International Film Festival in New York City on 31 October 2015. Latin Post film critic David Salazar called the film "A triumphant debut" noting of the three lead actors that "the trio delivers masterful performances", calling the flashback sequences "what a Terrence Malick film would look like in black and white", and that the film "has shown that Cura has a tremendous future as a visual storyteller, his ability to deliver a strong performance coupled with a compelling film based on the work of a famed writer a truly remarkable feat".

Blazing Minds film critic Susanne Hodder said of the actors that "all give compelling performances, bringing their characters to life and giving them depth" and concluded her review saying that "Creditors is an intelligent thought-provoking film which questions gender roles, female sexuality and male anxieties, making for an enjoyable and compelling watch."

Screen Relish film critic Stuie Greenfield highlighted the script structure and striking visuals by saying that "Elongated scenes provide beautiful imagery and vignettes of the Spanish landscape that are interspersed with a clever and well-developed script. These long, meaningful scenes bring with them an almost arthouse styling that adds to the charisma and allure of Cura's magnetic film." He concluded that "Creditors is a beautiful, sometimes angry and surprising film that brings with it strong performances from the entire cast as well as an unexpected yet welcome twist. Cura has produced, written and directed a piece of film that he should be very proud of, and one that demonstrates an incredible aptitude for intense, thought-provoking cinema. He is one to watch out for, as is Creditors."

Movie Marker film critic Darryl Griffiths said of the film "The initial intended seclusion and comfort of its setting is impeccably skewered and realised by director/star Cura, gradually feeding into the sinister, slow-burner tone along with the immersive, minimalist score. From the exquisitely steady aerial shots to the jarring fast-motion captures of Madrid, to the beautifully observed silence that fills the revealing flashbacks, the film's conversion to screen thrillingly avoids the stilted, laboured approach that so often befalls such works." He added of Andrea Deck, Ben Cura and Christian McKay "Reveling in the femme fatale tendencies of her character as she embraces the classic film noir archetype, Andrea Deck's Chloe exudes an explosive elegance whom thrives on independence and attention. Ultimately adding a compelling dimension to the powerful prose that leaves the mouths of Cura and McKay respectively. Whilst both provide distinct full-bodied performances individually, together they are terrific in conveying the theatrics of its source." Griffiths concluded his review saying that "The heightened melodrama of its brilliantly staged finale may be of acquired taste. Yet for a directorial debut, Creditors is an incisive and accomplished piece of filmmaking that defies such a tag, possessing a rich, powerful psychology that instills an unnerving modern-day relevance to age-old material."

Creditors screened in competition at the 2015 Anchorage International Film Festival in Alaska to further press, media, and festival audiences. It was followed by screenings at the Borrego Springs Film Festival, the Berlin Independent Film Festival, the Big Muddy Film Festival, and the Queens World Film Festival.

The film also screened at the Borrego Springs Film Festival, the Berlin Independent Film Festival, the Big Muddy Film Festival, the Phoenix Film Festival, the Queens World Film Festival, the Palm Beach International Film Festival, the Houston WorldFest, the Madrid International Film Festival and the Cebu International Film Festival, winning many awards and accolades along the way.

As of 29 October 2016, the film has been made available to watch on exclusive on demand platform Flix Premiere in the US, and will be made available in other territories in the months following its USA release.

== Awards ==
Year	Festival/Publication	Award	Notes
2015	Nordic International Film Festival	Best Nordic Narrative Feature (Honorable Mention)	Winner
2015	indieFEST Film Awards	Award of Excellence Feature Film	Winner
2015	indieFEST Film Awards	Award of Excellence Leading Actor (Christian McKay)	Winner
2015	indieFEST Film Awards	Award of Excellence Leading Actor (Ben Cura)	Winner
2015	indieFEST Film Awards	Award of Excellence Leading Actress (Andrea Deck)	Winner
2015	NYC Indie Film Awards	Diamond Award Best Feature Film	Winner
2015	NYC Indie Film Awards	Diamond Award Cinematography (Ben Hecking)	Winner
2015	NYC Indie Film Awards	Gold Award Editing (Teresa Font)	Winner
2016	Accolade Global Film Competition	Award of Excellence Cinematography (Ben Hecking)	Winner
2016	Accolade Global Film Competition	Award of Merit Special Mention Editing (Teresa Font)	Winner
2016	Accolade Global Film Competition	Award of Merit Special Mention Original Score (Nina Aranda)	Winner
2016	Accolade Global Film Competition	Award of Merit Special Mention Script / Writer (Ben Cura)	Winner
2016	Accolade Global Film Competition	Award of Merit Special Mention Feature Film	Winner
2016	Los Angeles Film Review Independent Awards	Gold Award Feature Film	Winner
2016	Worldfest Houston Film Festival	Silver Remi Experimental Dogma Feature	Winner
2016	Mexico International Film Festival	Silver Award Best Feature Film	Winner
2016	Mexico International Film Festival	Silver Award First Time Filmmaker (Ben Cura)	Winner
2016	Madrid International Film Festival	Best Editing in a Feature Film (Teresa Font)	Winner
2015	Anchorage International Film Festival	Best Feature Film (In Competition)	Nominated
2016	Borrego Springs Film Festival	Best Feature Film (In Competition)	Nominated
2016	Berlin Independent Film Festival	Best Feature Film (In Competition)	Nominated
2016	Queens World Film Festival	Best Cinematography (Ben Hecking)	Nominated
2016	Madrid International Film Festival	Best Leading Actress (Andrea Deck)	Nominated
2016	Madrid International Film Festival	Talented New Director (Ben Cura)	Nominated
2016	Madrid International Film Festival	Best Cinematography (Ben Hecking)	Nominated
