= Ntjam Rosie =

Dutch-Cameroonian singer-songwriter

- Ntjam Rosie in 2026

Background information
- Born: Rosie Boei; March 18, 1983 (age 43); Sonkoe, Cameroon
- Origin: Rotterdam, Netherlands
- Education: Codarts Conservatory Rotterdam
- Genres: Pop; Jazz; Soul; Afrobeat
- Occupations: Singer; songwriter
- Years active: 1998–present
- Labels: Gentle Daze Records; o-tone music; EdelKultur
- Website: ntjamrosie.com

Ntjam Rosie, born as Rosie Boei (born 18 March 1983 in Sonkoe, Cameroon), is a Dutch-Cameroonian singer-songwriter based in Rotterdam. Her style blends pop music, jazz and soul with West and Central African influences. She moved to the Netherlands at the age of nine, initially settling in Maastricht, and relocated to Rotterdam around the age of eighteen.

== Career ==
=== Early career and first albums ===
Ntjam Rosie (then working under the name Ntjamrosie) released her debut album Atouba through Gentle Daze Records on 20 January 2008, produced by Nelson & Djosa. The album's sound has been described as future Afro-soul; "Patience" was released as a single.

She graduated from the Codarts Conservatory Rotterdam with a bachelor's degree in music, majoring in Latin singing and minoring in teaching.

Her second album, Elle, was released independently in 2010, again produced by Nelson & Djosa. It was nominated for an Edison Jazzism Audience Award in 2011. For Elle, Rosie drew inspiration from artists including George Duke, Stevie Wonder, Patrice Rushen, Syreeta and Miriam Makeba. Musicians on the album included UK-based drummer Nathan Allen (Amy Winehouse, Faith Evans) and bassist Alex Bonfanti (Tom Jones, Xantone Blacq), as well as Ronald Snijders (flute), Tuur Moens (drums) and Alexander van Popta (keys). Recording took place at Flowriders Music studio in Amsterdam.

In 2012 Ntjam Rosie released Live at Grounds, a CD/DVD recorded at the Grounds venue in Rotterdam. Her third studio album, At the Back of Beyond, followed on 15 March 2013, produced by jazz pianist, composer and producer Alexander van Popta. The album's title was inspired by the film Black Narcissus; guitar plays a larger role on the record than on Elle. It was released on Rosie's own label, Gentle Daze Records, and was nominated for the Edison Jazzism Audience Award.

Rosie has appeared on Dutch media programmes including the Giel Beelen 3FM radio show, De Wereld Draait Door, Vrije Geluiden and BNN. She has been a support act for Erykah Badu, José James, Macy Gray and Bilal, and has played venues including Paradiso, Melkweg, Rotown and Sugar Factory, and festivals such as Dunya, Mundial and Jazz in Duketown. In 2011 she performed at the North Sea Jazz Festival.

=== Later albums (2015–2023) ===
Her fourth album, The One (2015), was self-produced and nominated for both the Edison Jazzism Audience Award and Best Female Artist at the NPO Radio 6 Soul & Jazz Awards. In 2017 she released the EP Never Give Up, followed the same year by her fifth studio album, Breaking Cycles, which won Best Soul Album of the Year from Echoes magazine and was nominated for the Edison Jazzism Audience Award in 2018.

Her sixth album, Family and Friends, was released in February 2020. Its single "Sailing Out" was remixed by Brazilian producers Slow Motion & Gabe and released on Spinnin' Deep later that year. In December 2021 she released the home-recorded solo EP Home Cooking. In 2022 she featured on "Nothing Can Tear Us Apart" (Das Sound Kollektiv) and "Get into the Groove" (with Hades and Kav Verhouzer). In October 2023 she released the Ko-Kolo EP with Dutch Afro-house producer Cincity. Also in 2023 she teamed up with production duo SMANDEM. to release Elle – Reworked (o-tone music). That November she was the featured guest on the NPO 3/PowNed programme Podium ZWART: Unplugged, discussing her Cameroonian roots and performing with singer Kris Berry and kora player Lamin Kuyateh.

In 2024 Rosie released the EP Embrace the New with the 18-piece Dutch groove/funk big band Licks & Brains, led by saxophonist Rolf Delfos, exploring the boundary between electronic dance music, jazz and African music. In 2025 she featured on "You Got This" by the Dutch brass ensemble Valvetronic, from their album Beyond Our Shores. On 8 June 2025 she was a guest performer with Cameroonian bassist Richard Bona at the Music Meeting festival in Nijmegen.

=== Theatre and cross-disciplinary work ===
Alongside her music career, Rosie has worked repeatedly in theatre and dance. In 2016 she toured Dutch theatres with Homelands, a collaboration with the Artvark Saxophone Quartet inspired by Cameroonian and wider African music traditions, followed by a reprise tour in 2016–2017; a live recording, Homelands (Live in Rotterdam), credited to Artvark Saxophone Quartet featuring Ntjam Rosie, was released on Oink Records in February 2017. In 2016–2017 she also appeared in the theatre tour We hadden liefde, we hadden wapens alongside Huub van der Lubbe.

Between 2019 and 2022 she toured the Netherlands and Belgium with Dear Winnie, a co-production of the Flemish theatre company KVS and Toneelgroep NNT with text by Fikry El Azzouzi and direction by Junior Mthombeni, presenting a tribute to Winnie Madikizela-Mandela performed by nine Black women. She also performed as a stand-in in the Flemish KVS music-theatre production Malcolm X.

In 2024 and 2025 she was a vocalist in Normality No More, a dance and music-theatre piece by Conny Janssen Danst, Via Berlin and the Ragazze Quartet reworking Schubert's Winterreise, touring Dutch theatres from December 2024 to April 2025.

In spring 2024 she toured with the Ricciotti Ensemble on Ricciotti's Fantastische Vrouwentour ("Fantastic Women's Tour"), a programme spotlighting compositions written exclusively by women across genres and centuries.

In October 2025 she performed five concerts with the Metropole Orkest as part of salute African Queens, a programme honouring African and diaspora female singers including Miriam Makeba, Angélique Kidjo, Cesária Évora and Oumou Sangaré, alongside emerging artists such as Tems and Ayra Starr.

=== Ninth studio album and "Who I Am" tour (2026) ===
Rosie's ninth studio album, the self-titled Ntjam Rosie, was released on 24 April 2026 through o-tone music/EdelKultur. Written largely on guitar over two years, the album was produced with Fontanez (Lucas Meijers) and Rik van der Ouw, with additional production by Tim Eijmaal on the single "Better". It moves between English and Rosie's mother tongue Bulu, and explores themes of faith, identity, motherhood and artistic freedom. The album was preceded by the singles "Better" (6 February 2026) and "In Your Arms".

In its review, Jazz in Europe called the record "a quietly exceptional album from an artist at her most honest and most assured", highlighting tracks such as "Nelly's Song", "Fefel ôsôé (By Streams of Water)" and "Lost in Translation".

From 16 May 2026 Rosie has toured Dutch theatres with the "Who I Am" tour, performing songs from the new album alongside a full band and personal stories about identity, love and growth. In November 2026 the tour was extended into 2027, with further dates in Sittard, Harderwijk and Tilburg.

== International ==
Rosie has opened for Jesse Boykins III at the London Jazz Cafe. Since 2017 her albums have been released across Germany, Switzerland and Austria (the "GSA" region) through the German label o-tone music, while Elle was earlier released in Germany, Switzerland, Austria and Japan, and At the Back of Beyond was released in the United Kingdom on 29 August 2013. She has performed across Europe — including Belgium, Luxembourg, France, Germany, Switzerland, the United Kingdom, the Czech Republic, Lithuania and Bulgaria — as well as in China, South Korea, Azerbaijan, Qatar, South Africa and Suriname.

== Discography ==
Studio albums

- 2008: Atouba (as Ntjamrosie)
- 2010: Elle
- 2013: At the Back of Beyond
- 2015: The One
- 2017: Breaking Cycles
- 2020: Family and Friends
- 2023: Elle – Reworked (with SMANDEM.)
- 2026: Ntjam Rosie

Live albums

- 2012: Live at Grounds
- 2017: Homelands (Live in Rotterdam) (Artvark Saxophone Quartet feat. Ntjam Rosie, Oink Records)

EPs

- 2017: Never Give Up
- 2021: Home Cooking
- 2023: Ko-Kolo (with Cincity)
- 2024: Embrace the New (with Licks & Brains)

Selected singles and features

- 2008: "Patience"
- 2020: "Sailing Out" (Slow Motion & Gabe Remix, Spinnin' Deep)
- 2022: "Nothing Can Tear Us Apart" (Das Sound Kollektiv)
- 2022: "Get into the Groove" (with Hades, Kav Verhouzer)
- 2023: "Anthem" (with Levy M)
- 2025: "You Got This" (with Valvetronic)
- 2026: "Better"
- 2026: "In Your Arms"

== Awards and nominations ==
Awards

- 2019 – Winner, Operadagen Rotterdam Award
- 2017 – Winner, Best Soul Album of the Year, Echoes magazine (Breaking Cycles)
- 2010 – Winner, Music Matters Award (awarded December 2009)
- 2010 – Winner, MCN World Up! Award – Most Promising Talent (awarded December 2009)

Nominations

- 2018 – Nominee, Edison Jazzism Audience Award (Breaking Cycles)
- 2015 – Nominee, Best Female Artist, NPO Radio 6 Soul & Jazz Awards
- 2015 – Nominee, Edison Jazzism Audience Award (The One)
- 2013 – Nominee, Edison Jazzism Audience Award (At the Back of Beyond)
- 2013 – Nominee, Elle Personal Style Awards
- 2011 – Nominee, Edison Jazzism Audience Award (Elle)
