= The Devil's Violinist =

2013 film by Bernard Rose

- Theatrical poster
- Directed by: Bernard Rose
- Written by: Bernard Rose
- Produced by: Dominic Berger; Craig Blake-Jones
- Starring: David Garrett; Jared Harris; Joely Richardson; Christian McKay; Veronica Ferres; Helmut Berger; Olivia d'Abo; Andrea Deck
- Music by: David Garrett; Franck van der Heijden
- Production companies: UFA; ARTE; Bayerischer Rundfunk; Film House Germany; Sky Deutschland; Summer Storm Entertainment
- Distributed by: Universum Film; Buena Vista International
- Release date: 31 October 2013
- Running time: 122 minutes
- Countries: Germany; Italy
- Languages: English; German

The Devil's Violinist is a 2013 film written and directed by Bernard Rose. It is based on the life story of the 19th-century Italian violinist and composer Niccolò Paganini. The film had its US premiere on 10 March 2014 at the Miami International Film Festival.

== Plot ==
When he is approached by a supporter wishing to finance his musical career, Niccolo Paganini becomes attracted to the life which Urbani the promoter has come to offer him. He signs a contract to oblige him to perform as scheduled by Urbani which appears to temporarily ease his financial discomfort. Still, Paganini cannot control his lust for gambling and begins to challenge even Urbani's ability to finance him. At one gambling house, he empties his pockets from his losses and then even wagers his violin for the table stakes in a card game. The proprietor offers him the option of simply playing something on the violin for the patrons of the club in order to cover the stakes of the bet, but Paganini refuses and says "I am nobody's servant". The bet stands and Paganini ends up losing his violin.

At a practice in London, Paganini borrows a violin from the first violinist in the orchestra. At a later concert, the King enters his box at the theatre and Paganini interrupts the sequence of his scheduled numbers to perform an improvised version of God Save the King, to tumultuous applause. Paganini is again a success and the first violinist makes a gift of his own violin to Paganini. Meanwhile, Paganini begins to form a relationship with Charlotte, the daughter and protégé of his manager John Watson, who is an accomplished soprano. Paganini composes a duet to perform with her which is very well received and appears to push the protégé into the spotlight. When a romantic relationship springs up between Paganini and Charlotte, her very youthful appearance causes the police to take notice and Paganini is arrested for seducing a minor. Urbani rescues him again by presenting proof that Charlotte is not underage and Paganini is released.

To deal with the situation of Paganini being distracted by this protégé, Urbani arranges a rendezvous between Paganini and Charlotte after one of his performances, however, he invites a courtesan to visit Paganini's dark hotel bedroom before Charlotte arrives. Paganini assumes in the darkness that it is Charlotte come to visit him and does not realize that he is sharing his bed with a courtesan. When Charlotte learns of Paganini's philandering she is livid and the chances of a relationship with Paganini become permanently tainted. Urbani's plan to alienate her affections by hiring the courtesan has succeeded. Paganini then returns to fulfilling his contract with Urbani and performing at various venues throughout Europe.

Paganini's romance with his manager's protégé ends and she leaves the country. Eventually she marries and starts a family abroad. As the years pass, Paganini becomes severely ill from his years of living a prodigal life of sexual license and opium addiction and he dies of related symptoms bringing his virtuosity and career in music to an end.

== Cast ==
- David Garrett as Niccolò Paganini
- Jared Harris as Urbani
- Andrea Deck as Charlotte Watson
- Joely Richardson as Ethel Langham
- Christian McKay as John Watson
- Veronica Ferres as Elizabeth Wells
- Helmut Berger as Lord Burghersh
- Olivia d'Abo as Primrose Blackstone

== Production ==
Filming took place in Germany, Austria, and Italy.

== Music ==
Violinist David Garrett performs many of Paganini's pieces throughout the film, including Caprice No. 24 in A minor and "Carnival of Venice".

The English version of "Io Ti Penso Amore" features lead vocals by Nicole Scherzinger. Andrea Deck provides vocals sung in Italian in the film. The melody of the song is set to the violin introduction of the second movement, Adagio flebile con sentimento, of Paganini's Violin Concerto No. 4.

== Release ==
The film premiered on 31 October 2013 in Germany, 27 February 2014 in Italy, and had its US premiere on 10 March 2014 at the Miami International Film Festival.|Stryker Entertainment

== Reception ==
Simon Abrams writing on RogerEbert.com opens his review of the film by saying "While The Devil's Violinist, an arresting biopic about inspired/possessed violinist and composer Niccolo Paganini, ends on a sour note, it's also beautiful and thoughtful."
