= Stray Blade =

- Developer: Point Blank Games
- Publisher: 505 Games
- Engine: Unreal Engine
- Platforms: PlayStation 5; Windows; Xbox Series X/S
- Release: WW: April 20, 2023
- Genre: Action role-playing
- Mode: Single-player

Stray Blade is an action role-playing video game developed by Point Blank Games and published by 505 Games in 2023.

== Gameplay ==
The adventurer Farren West dies while seeking the Lost Valley of Acrea but is resurrected later by a talking wolf named Boji. Players control West, who can be customized to be either male or female, and attempt to free themselves from the control of a crystal Boji used to resurrect West. Stray Blade is a Soulslike. Players must dodge or parry attacks in combat. Enemies indicate their next attack by flashing a color: blue attacks can be parried, while red attacks must be dodged. To attack, players need enough stamina, which they recover by perfectly timed parries and dodges. Players can also execute combos. After defeating bosses, players gain special abilities that they can use to customize their character through a skill tree. Boji assists players in combat and has his own skills.

== Development ==
505 Games released it for Windows, PlayStation 5, and Xbox Series X/S on April 20, 2023.

== Reception ==
Stray Blade received mixed reviews on Metacritic. Despite some bugs and poor performance in the PlayStation version, Push Square recommended Stray Blade to players looking for an entry-level Soulslike game. They praised the art style, narrative, and the combat, though they said combat could be "sluggish and imprecise". IGN wrote that it "tries and fails" to break genre conventions of Soulslike games. Though they enjoyed the colorful world and simplified combat, they felt it fell short of the quality of other Soulslike games. NME called it "the Fisher-Price of Soulslikes" and said it does not maintain its positive initial first impression.
