= Alexandre Willaume =

Danish actor (born 1972)

- Born: Alexandre Willaume-Jantzen; 20 December 1972 (age 53); Hellerup, Copenhagen, Denmark
- Education: Danish National School of Performing Arts
- Occupation: Actor
- Years active: 1996–present
- Spouse: Henriette Willaume Fobian (m. 1996; div. 2018)
- Partner: Lillie Østergaard
- Children: 2

Alexandre Willaume (born 20 December 1972) is a Danish actor having had roles in Home Fires (2016), Valerian and the City of a Thousand Planets and The Last Kingdom (2017), Tomb Raider (2018), COBRA and The Head (2020), The Wheel of Time (2021), and 1899 (2022).

== Early life ==
Alexandre Willaume-Jantzen was born 20 December 1972. in Hellerup, Copenhagen, Denmark. He studied acting at the Danish National School of Performing Arts (Den Danske Scenekunstskole) in Copenhagen from 1996 to 2000.

Willaume was previously married to Henriette Willaume Fobian for 22 years, however, the couple divorced in 2018. As of 2021, Willaume is in a relationship with Lillie Østergaard, who runs a beauty salon in Copenhagen.

== Career ==
Willaume spent several years at the Royal Danish Theatre, Copenhagen before realising it was not meant to be, and made him seek television and film roles.

In 2016, Willaume was cast as Marek Novotny for six episodes of the Julie Summers Jambusters based British wartime drama series Home Fires.

In 2017, Willaume starred as Captain Kris in the Luc Besson directed Valerian and the City of a Thousand Planets, in a cast which included John Goodman, Dane DeHaan, Cara Delevingne, Rihanna, Ethan Hawke, and Rutger Hauer. In the same year, he played a main role of Hans in the film Good Favour which featured at the 2017 Toronto International Film Festival.

In 2018, he starred in the film Tomb Raider working with Alicia Vikander who played Lara Croft.

In 2019, in the Viaplay series, Hidden: Förstfödd (Hidden : Firstborn), Willaume plays Maersk, and is the only Dane amongst a cast of Norwegians and Swedes, he considered this to be his most interesting work to date. In 2020, he starred as the station commander John Berg, in the Antarctic research mystery series The Head, playing a lead role alongside John Lynch.

In 2021, he guest starred in the Amazon Prime fantasy series The Wheel of Time, in a cast which included Rosamund Pike, and appeared in every episode of the Netflix period mystery-science fiction series 1899 in 2022.

== Filmography ==
=== Film ===
| Year | Title | Role | Notes |
|---|---|---|---|
| 1996 | Hvileløse hjerte | Himself | Short film |
| 1998 | Skyggen | Guy in Bathroom | Film |
| 2000 | Efterløn | Lars | Short film |
| 2000 | Indien | Mand i port | Short film |
| 2002 | P.I.S. - Politiets indsatsstyrke: Pilot | Speaker (voice) | Video |
| 2004 | Familien Gregersen | Sixten | Film |
| 2005 | Deadline | Lasse | Short film |
| 2006 | Sange fra baggrunden | Mads | Film |
| 2008 | A Viking Saga: Son of Thor | Oyvind | Film |
| 2008 | Superhelt | ? | Short film |
| 2009 | Winnie og Karina - The Movie | Fængselsbetjent | Film |
| 2009 | Fri os fra det onde (Deliver us from Evil) | Roald | Film |
| 2009 | De fantastiske 3 | Pølsemanden | Short film |
| 2010 | Nothing's All Bad | Pornofilmsfotograf | Film |
| 2010 | Bølle Bob - Alle tiders helt | Benny | Film |
| 2011 | Going Nowhere | Jannik | Short film |
| 2012 | As You Were | Lars | Short film |
| 2012 | Over the Edge | Roar Panowski Poulsen | Film |
| 2013 | The Detectives | Jo | Film |
| 2013 | Sorrow and Joy | Skoleinspektør (School inspector) | Film |
| 2014 | Listen | Police man | Short film |
| 2016 | Hundeliv | Adam | Film |
| 2017 | Kein Problem | Kim Langer | Short film |
| 2017 | Valerian and the City of a Thousand Planets | Captain Kris | Film |
| 2017 | Good Favour | Hans | Film |
| 2018 | Tomb Raider | Lieutenant | Film |
| 2022 | Moloch | Jonas | Film |

=== Television ===
| Year | Title | Role | Notes |
|---|---|---|---|
| 2000 | Skjulte spor | Victor Mørk | TV series |
| 2000 | Rejseholdet | Rocker Dennis | 1 episode |
| 2001 | Hotellet | Patric | 1 episode |
| 2003-2004 | Forsvar | Martin Christensen | 4 episodes |
| 2005 | Klovn | Sonny | 1 episode |
| 2008 | Deroute | Frederik | 4 episodes |
| 2009 | Store drømme | Bastian Dollerup | 1 episode |
| 2009 | Krysters Kartel | Various roles | 2 episodes |
| 2009 | Forbrydelsen | Stig Dragsholm | 2 episodes |
| 2011 | Ludvig & Julemanden | Niels Glad | 24 episodes |
| 2011 | Those Who Kill | Simon | 2 episodes |
| 2013–2015 | Rita | Jonas Poulsen | 16 episodes |
| 2015 | Crossing Lines | Anton Nielsen | 1 episode |
| 2016 | Home Fires | Marek Novotny | 6 episodes |
| 2015 - 2017 | The Last Kingdom | Kjartan | 4 episodes |
| 2018 | Deep State | Laurence | (Season 1) - 5 episodes |
| 2019 | Hidden: Förstfödd (Hidden : Firstborn) | Mærsk | 4 episodes |
| 2019 | Follow the Money | Rune | 2 episodes |
| 2017–2019 | Gidseltagningen | S.P. | 16 episodes |
| 2020 | COBRA | Edin Tosumbegovic | 5 episodes |
| 2020 | Equinox | Henrik | 6 episodes |
| 2020 | The Head | Johan Berg | 6 episodes |
| 2021 | The Wheel of Time | Thom Merrilin | 2 episodes |
| 2022 | 1899 | Anker | 8 episodes |

== Awards and nominations ==
| Year | Award | Category | Nominated work | Result | Ref. |
|---|---|---|---|---|---|
| 2010 | Zulu Awards | Best Performance in an Advertisement | Pede i WUPTI.com | Nominated | |
| 2017 | Bodil Awards | Best Actor in a Supporting Role | Hundeliv | Nominated | |
| 2022 | Anatomy Crime and Horror Film Festival | Jury Prize - Best Actor (Horror) | Moloch | Won | |
| 2022 | Anatomy Crime and Horror Film Festival | People's Choice - Best Actor | Moloch | Nominated | |
