= Austin Klezmorim =

American klezmer music group

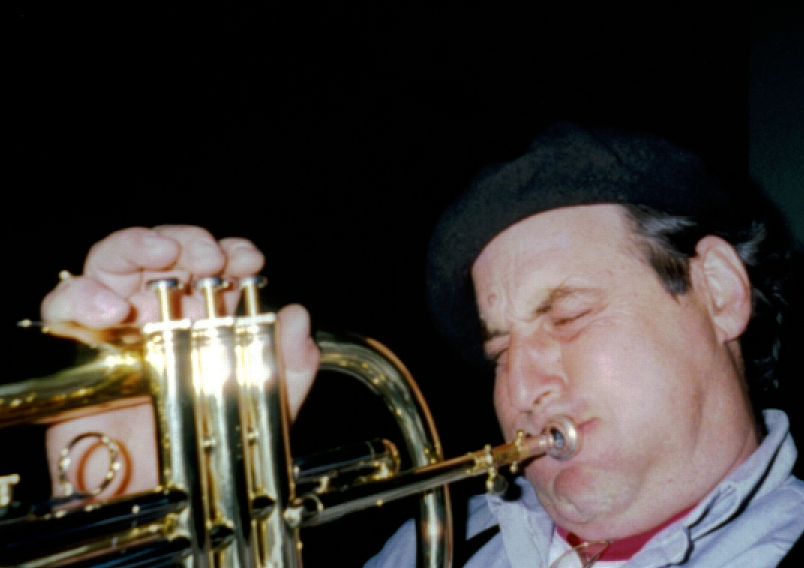
Bill Averbach playing fluglehorn

Austin Klezmorim is a klezmer music group founded in 1979 in Austin, Texas by trumpeter and composer Bill Averbach.

== Recordings ==
Self-Published Recordings

- Shalom Y'all 1979
- Texas Klez 1984
- East of Odessa 1992
- Bubba's Waltz 2005

Compilations

- Klezmer Music 2007 - Wagram Roots. Cat No: 3126522 Format: CD
- Balkan Fever 2008 - 4 CD Compilation, Wagram Roots. Cat No: 3134402. Format: CD

== Influence ==
Founded by trumpeter and composer Bill Averbach and based out of Austin, Texas, The Austin Klezmorim have performed concerts and festivals throughout the Southwest as members of the Texas Commission on the Arts Touring Artist Roster. Their influence has played an important role in the development of Austin music's more eclectic music reputation as the first modern "Klezmer" band in Texas and the oldest Klezmer band in the Southwest. Their music is a fusion of the traditional Klezmer, Jazz, worldbeat, and indigenous Texas music. The group combines the older, traditional music with more contemporary styles in order to keep the music alive and growing.
