= Michel Banabila =

Dutch composer and sound artist (born 1961)

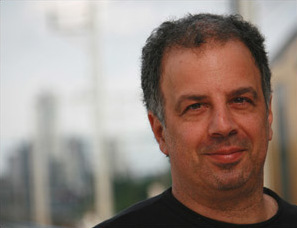
- Banabila in 2009

Background information
- Born: 1961 (age 64–65); Amsterdam, Netherlands
- Genre: Electronic
- Occupations: Musician, composer, producer
- Years active: 1983 – present
- Labels: Bureau B, Séance Centre, Challenge Records (1994)
- Website: banabila.com

Michel Banabila (born 14 April 1961 in Amsterdam, Netherlands) is a Dutch composer and sound artist. His work spans electronic and experimental composition, with output across film, documentary, theatre, installation, and contemporary dance contexts.

== Musical style ==
His compositions frequently incorporate found sound material and manipulated vocal fragments using sampling-based techniques, spanning ambient music, minimal music, drone music, and plunderphonics.

== Career and collaborations ==
He has collaborated with choreographers including Annabelle Lopez Ochoa and Conny Janssen, and composed the score for Somewhere by Yin Yue, performed at New York Live Arts in 2024. Banabila performed live in 2013 in the auditorium of the Hirshhorn Museum, Washington, at the opening of the exhibition of Crops, an audiovisual installation with photographer Gerco de Ruijter. He performed live with media artist Geert Mul with their audiovisual set Big Data Poetry at the Logan Symposium, in the Barbican, London, in 2014 and in Yukunkun at the Global Week For Syria in Beirut, in 2015. In 2015, he also appeared at the Sonic Circuits Festival, Silver Spring, with a small modular improv set. Banabila is a member of the Disquiet Junto group. He lives with his wife and daughter in Rotterdam.

== Awards ==
In 2003, Banabila and trumpeter Eric Vloeimans received the Edison Award in the Jazz National category for VoizNoiz 3 – Urban Jazz Scapes.

== Discography ==
- Marilli (Eduard Vingerhoets, 1983)
- Des Traces Retrouvees (Trichord, 1984)
- VoizNoiz: Urban Sound Scapes (Steamin' Soundworks 1999)
- VoizNoiz II: Urban Sound Scapes (Tone Casualties, 2001)
- Spherics (Tone Casualties, 2001)
- Spherics II (Boudisque 2003)
- Phonema (Tapu, 2003)
- VoizNoiz 3 – Urban Jazz Scapes with Eric Vloeimans (Javaanse Jongens, 2003)
- Live-Mix (Requiem, 2005)
- Hilarious Expedition (Tapu, 2005)
- Music for Films & Documentaries (Tapu, 2007)
- 0+1+0+1+0+1+0+1+0+ (Tapu, 2010)
- Changing Structures (Tapu, 2010)
- The Latest Research from the Department of Electrical Engineering (Tapu, 2011)
- In Other Words (Tapu, 2011)
- Sum Dark 12 (Tapu, 2012)
- TENT 06 & 16 & 2012 (Tapu, 2012)
- Gardening (Tapu, 2012)
- 47 Voice Loops (Tapu, 2013)
- Float (Tapu, 2013)
- ZoomWorld (Tapu, 2013)
- More Research from the Same Dept. (Tapu, 2014)
- Music for Viola and Electronics I with Oene van Geel (Tapu, 2014)
- Music for Viola and Electronics II with Oene van Geel (Tapu, 2015)
- Gorlice 2014 (Tapu, 2014)
- Eyes Closed (Tapu, 2015)
- Jump Cuts (Tapu, 2015)
- Meet Me in Venice with Beppe Costa (Tapu, 2015)
- Feedback + Modular + Radiowaves (Tapu, 2015)
- Feedback + Modular + Radiowaves II (Tapu, 2015)
- Feedback + Modular + Radiowaves III (Tapu, 2016)
- Earth Visitor (Tapu, 2016)
- Early Works (Bureau B, 2016)
- Sound Years (Tapu, 2017)
- New Land with Eric Vloeimans (Tapu, 2017)
- Trespassing (Séance Centre, 2017)
- Imprints (Tapu, 2018)
- Just Above the Surface (Tapu, 2018)
- Winter Sketches (Tapu, 2019)
- Uprooted (Tapu, 2019)
- Wah-Wah Whispers (Bureau B, 2021)
- Echo Transformations (Knekelhuis, 2021)

With Robin Rimbaud

- Banabila / Scanner (Steamin'Soundworks, 2010)
- Between Your Eyes And Mine (Tapu, 2013)
- The Spaces You Hold (Scanner, 2020)

With Machinefabriek

- Banabila & Machinefabriek (Tapu, 2012)
- Travelog (Tapu, 2013)
- Error Log (Tapu, 2015)
- Macrocosms (Tapu, 2016)
- Entropia (Eilean, 2019)
- Cassina (7K!, 2020)

With Pierre Bastien

- Baba Soirée (Pingipung, 2023)
- Nuits Sans Nuit (Pingipung, 2025)
