= List of awards and nominations received by Kerry Washington =

Kerry Washington awards and nominations
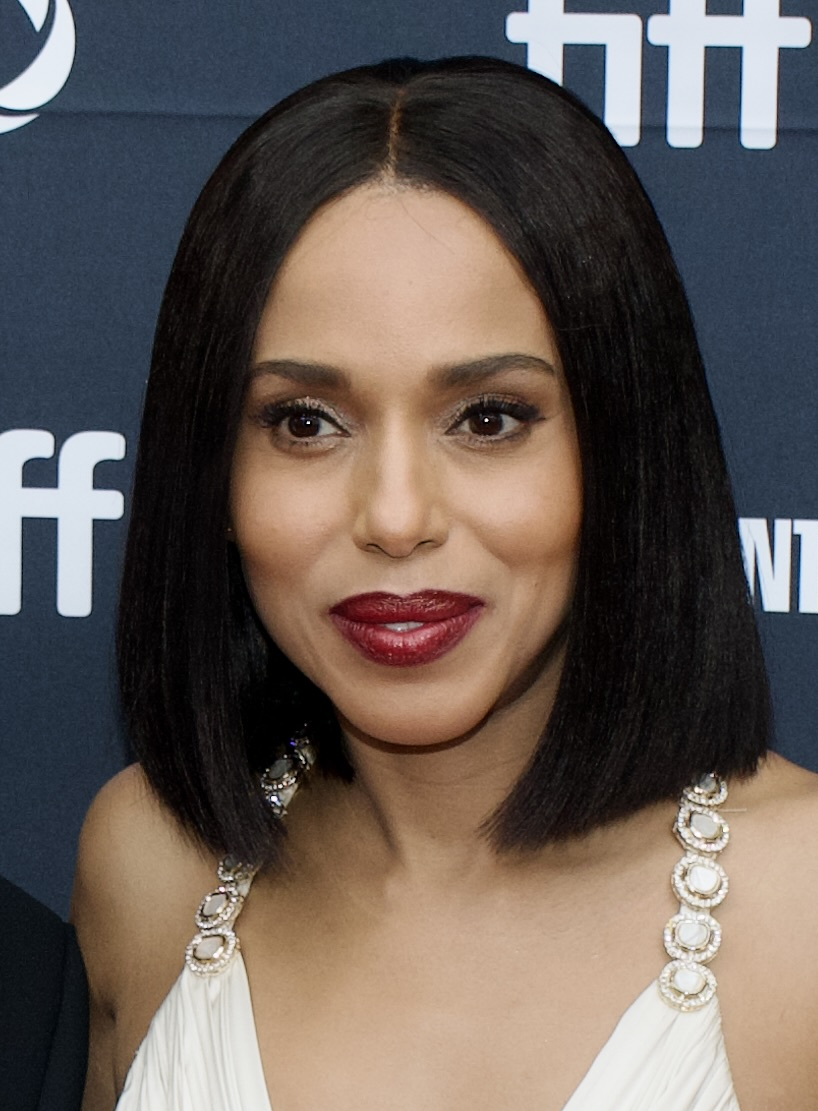
- Washington at the Toronto International Film Festival
Awards and nominations
| Award | Wins | Nominations |
| Black Reel Awards | 5 | 14 |
| Emmy Awards | 1 | 9 |
| Golden Globe Awards | 0 | 2 |
| NAACP Image Awards | 7 | 18 |
| Spirit Awards | 0 | 1 |
| SAG Awards | 0 | 4 |
| Tony Awards | 0 | 2 |

Totals (Note: Certain award groups do not simply award one winner. They acknowledge several different recipients, have runners-up, and have third place. Since this is a specific recognition and is different from losing an award, runner-up mentions are considered wins in this award tally. For simplification and to avoid errors, each award in this list has been presumed to have had a prior nomination.)
- Wins: 22
- Nominations: 83

The following is a list of awards and nominations received by Kerry Washington.

Kerry Washington is an American actress known for her roles in film and television. She has received various accolades including a Primetime Emmy Award, six Black Reel Awards, seven NAACP Image Awards and a Satellite Award as well as nominations for a Critics' Choice Television Award, two Golden Globe Awards, an Independent Spirit Award, and four Screen Actors Guild Awards and two Tony Awards.

Starting her careen in the lately 1990s and received critical attention for playing a thief in the thriller Lift (2001) for which she was nominated for the Independent Spirit Award for Best Female Lead. Washington received international attention for her interpretation of Della Bea Robinson on the film Ray (2004), being nominated at the Satellite Award, Screen Actors Guild Awards and winning her first NAACP Image Award. In 2012 she was cast by Quentin Tarantino for his Western film Django Unchained, for which she won her second NAACP Image Award and a BET Awards.

Washington starred as Olivia Pope on political thriller series Scandal (2012–2018), being nominated at the Golden Globe Award, Primetime Emmy Awards and Screen Actors Guild Award. In 2016 she played the main role of Anita Hill on film Confirmation, receiving nominations at the Golden Globe, Primetime Emmy Award and Critics' Choice Television Award. She played a single mother in the Hulu miniseries Little Fires Everywhere (2020) for which she was nominated for the Primetime Emmy Award and Screen Actors Guild Award for Best Actress in a Limited Series.

As a producer, Washington won the Primetime Emmy Award for Outstanding Variety Special (Live) for Live in Front of A Studio Audience: "All in the Family" and "Good Times" (2020). She set her sights to Broadway producing revival productions of the Ossie Davis play Purlie Victorious: A Non-Confederate Romp through the Cotton Patch and the Stephen Sondheim musical Gypsy for which she was nominated for two Tony Awards.

== Major associations ==
=== Critics' Choice Awards ===
| Year | Category | Nominated work | Result | Ref. |
Critics' Choice Television Awards
| 2016 | Best Actress in a Miniseries or Movie | Confirmation | Nominated | |

=== Emmy Awards ===
| Year | Category | Nominated work | Result | Ref. |
|---|---|---|---|---|
| 2013 | Outstanding Lead Actress in a Drama Series | Scandal (episode: "Happy Birthday Mr. President") | Nominated | |
| 2014 | Outstanding Lead Actress in a Drama Series | Scandal (episode: "The Fluffer") | Nominated | |
| 2016 | Outstanding Television Movie | Confirmation | Nominated | |
| 2016 | Outstanding Lead Actress in a Limited Series or Movie | Confirmation | Nominated | |
| 2020 | Outstanding Limited Series | Little Fires Everywhere | Nominated | |
| 2020 | Outstanding Lead Actress in a Limited Series or Movie | Little Fires Everywhere | Nominated | |
| 2020 | Outstanding Television Movie | American Son | Nominated | |
| 2020 | Outstanding Variety Special (Live) | Live in Front of A Studio Audience (Note: Nominated for the episodes from: "All in the Family" and "Good Times") | Won | |
| 2022 | Outstanding Variety Special (Live) | Live in Front of a Studio Audience (Note: Nominated for the episodes from: "The Facts of Life" and "Diff'rent Strokes") | Nominated | |

=== Golden Globe Awards ===
| Year | Category | Nominated work | Result | Ref. |
|---|---|---|---|---|
| 2013 | Best Actress – Television Series Drama | Scandal | Nominated | |
| 2016 | Best Actress – Miniseries or Television Film | Confirmation | Nominated | |

=== Independent Spirit Awards ===
| Year | Category | Nominated work | Result | Ref. |
|---|---|---|---|---|
| 2001 | Best Female Lead | Lift | Nominated | |

=== Screen Actors Guild Awards ===
| Year | Category | Nominated work | Result | Ref. |
|---|---|---|---|---|
| 2004 | Outstanding Cast in a Motion Picture | Ray | Nominated | |
| 2013 | Outstanding Actress in a Drama Series | Scandal | Nominated | |
| 2016 | Outstanding Actress in a Miniseries or TV Movie | Confirmation | Nominated | |
| 2020 | Outstanding Actress in a Miniseries or TV Movie | Little Fires Everywhere | Nominated | |

=== Tony Awards ===
| Year | Category | Nominated work | Result | Ref. |
|---|---|---|---|---|
| 2024 | Best Revival of a Play | Purlie Victorious | Nominated | |
| 2025 | Best Revival of a Musical | Gypsy | Nominated | |

== Other awards and nominations ==
=== BET Awards ===
| Year | Category | Work | Result |
|---|---|---|---|
| 2007 | Best Actress | The Last King of Scotland | Nominated |
| 2011 | Best Actress | For Colored Girls and Night Catches Us | Nominated |
| 2013 | Best Actress | Scandal and Django Unchained | Won |
| 2015 | Best Actress | Scandal | Nominated |
| 2025 | Best Actress | The Six Triple Eight, Unprisoned and Shadow Force | Nominated |

=== Black Reel Awards ===
| Year | Category | Work | Result |
|---|---|---|---|
| 2002 | Outstanding Independent Actor | Lift | Won |
| 2002 | Outstanding Supporting Actress Theatrical | Save the Last Dance | Won |
| 2003 | Outstanding Actress, Network/Cable | Lift | Nominated |
| 2005 | Outstanding Actress, Drama | Ray | Nominated |
| 2007 | Outstanding Supporting Actress | The Last King of Scotland | Nominated |
| 2009 | Outstanding Ensemble | Miracle at St. Anna | Nominated |
| 2011 | Outstanding Supporting Actress | For Colored Girls | Nominated |
| 2011 | Outstanding Actress, Drama | Night Catches Us | Won |
| 2011 | Outstanding Ensemble | Night Catches Us | Nominated |
| 2011 | Outstanding Ensemble | For Colored Girls | Won |
| 2013 | Outstanding Supporting Actress | Django Unchained | Nominated |
| 2017 | Outstanding Actress, TV Movie or Limited Series | Confirmation | Won |
| 2023 | Outstanding Directing in a Drama Series | Reasonable Doubt | Won |
| 2025 | Outstanding Lead Performance | The Six Triple Eight | Nominated |
| 2025 | Outstanding Lead Performance in a Comedy Series | Unprisoned | Nominated |

=== NAACP Image Awards ===
| Year | Category | Work | Result | Ref. |
|---|---|---|---|---|
| 2005 | Outstanding Actress in a Motion Picture | Ray | Won | |
| 2006 | Outstanding Supporting Actress in a Drama Series | Boston Legal | Nominated | |
| 2007 | Outstanding Actress in a Motion Picture | The Last King of Scotland | Nominated | |
| 2011 | Outstanding Actress in a Motion Picture | Night Catches Us | Nominated | |
| 2013 | Outstanding Supporting Actress in a Motion Picture | Django Unchained | Won | |
| 2013 | Outstanding Actress in a Drama Series | Scandal | Won | |
| 2014 | Outstanding Actress in a Drama Series | Scandal | Won | |
| 2015 | Outstanding Actress in a Drama Series | Scandal | Nominated | |
| 2016 | Outstanding Actress in a Drama Series | Scandal | Nominated | |
| 2017 | Outstanding Actress in a Drama Series | Scandal | Nominated | |
| 2017 | Outstanding Actress in a Television Movie, Limited Series or Dramatic Special | Confirmation | Nominated | |
| 2020 | Outstanding Actress in a Television Movie, Limited-Series or Dramatic Special | American Son | Nominated | |
| 2021 | Outstanding Actress in a Television Movie, Limited-Series or Dramatic Special | Little Fires Everywhere | Nominated | |
| 2024 | Outstanding Actress in a Comedy Series | UnPrisoned | Nominated | |
| 2024 | Outstanding News / Information – (Series or Special) | 20/20 – Kerry Washington: Thicker Than Water – A Conversation with Robin Roberts | Won | |
| 2025 | Outstanding Actress in a Motion Picture | The Six Triple Eight | Won | |
| 2025 | Outstanding Ensemble Cast in a Motion Picture | The Six Triple Eight | Won | |
| 2025 | Outstanding Actress in a Comedy Series | UnPrisoned | Nominated | |
| 2026 | Outstanding Actress in a Motion Picture | Shadow Force | Nominated | |

=== Satellite Awards ===
| Year | Category | Work | Result | Ref. |
|---|---|---|---|---|
| 2005 | Best Actress in a Comedy/Musical | Ray | Nominated | |
| 2017 | Best Actress in a Miniseries or a Motion Picture Made for Television | Confirmation | Nominated | |
| 2026 | Best Ensemble in a Motion Picture | Wake Up Dead Man: Knives Out | Won | |

== Miscellaneous ==
| Award | Year | Category | Work | Result | Ref. |
|---|---|---|---|---|---|
| ACE Award | 2014 | Influencer Award | Herself | Won | |
| Grio Awards | 2013 | Actress Award | Scandal | Won | |
| MTV Movie Awards | 2013 | Best Kiss | Django Unchained | Nominated | |
| People's Choice Awards | 2015 | Favorite Dramatic TV Actress | Scandal | Nominated | |
| People's Choice Awards | 2016 | Favorite Dramatic TV Actress | Scandal | Nominated | |
| People's Choice Awards | 2017 | Favorite Dramatic TV Actress | Scandal | Nominated | |
| People's Choice Awards | 2018 | The Drama TV Star of 2018 | Scandal | Nominated | |
| People's Choice Awards | 2018 | The Female TV Star of 2018 | Scandal | Nominated | |
| Teen Choice Awards | 2001 | Choice Breakout Performance | Save the Last Dance | Won | |
| Teen Choice Awards | 2013 | Choice Movie Actress: Comedy | Tyler Perry Presents Peeples | Nominated | |
| Teen Choice Awards | 2016 | Choice TV Actress: Drama | Scandal | Nominated | |
| TV Guide Awards | 2013 | TV Star of the Year | Herself | Won | |
| TV Guide Awards | 2013 | Favorite Actress | Scandal | Won | |
| TV Guide Awards | 2013 | Favorite Ensemble | Scandal | Nominated | |
| TV Guide Awards | 2014 | Favorite TV Actress | Scandal | Nominated | |

== Critics' awards ==
| Award | Year | Category | Work | Result | Ref. |
|---|---|---|---|---|---|
| AARP Movies for Grownups Awards | 2026 | Best Ensemble | Wake Up Dead Man | Nominated | |
| Astra Film Awards | 2026 | Best Cast Ensemble | Wake Up Dead Man | Nominated | |
| Dorian Awards | 2014 | TV Performance of the Year – Actress | Scandal | Nominated | |
| Georgia Film Critics Association | 2013 | Best Ensemble | Django Unchained | Nominated | |
| Hasty Pudding Theatricals | 2016 | Woman of the Year | Herself | Won | |
| New York Film Critics Online | 2025 | Best Ensemble Cast | Wake Up Dead Man | Nominated | |
| SAG Foundation Awards | 2014 | Favorite Dramatic TV Actress | Scandal | Won | |
| San Diego Film Critics Society | 2012 | Best Ensemble Performance | Django Unchained | Nominated | |
| Washington DC Area Film Critics Association Awards | 2025 | Best Ensemble | Wake Up Dead Man | Nominated | |
