= L. Peter Callender =

American theatre director and actor

L. Peter Callender is an American director and actor. Since 2009, he has been the artistic director of the African-American Shakespeare Company. He was trained at The Juilliard School.

== Education and influences ==
Callender was born in Trinidad, West Indies. He grew up in England and New York.

Callender was trained at The Juilliard School, Webber Douglas Academy of Dramatic Art in England, and Tadashi Suzuki Company of Toga in Japan.

== Career ==
Callender has directed and acted on numerous major stages in the United States. In 2018, he was among American Theatre’s “Theatre Workers You Should Know”.

=== Acting ===
Callender performed on Broadway and off-Broadway. He played Curio in Twelfth Night at Shakespeare in the Park (New York City), directed by Harold Guskin. He was in The Caucasian Chalk Circle at The Public Theater, directed by George C. Wolfe. He played Roscoe in the original cast of Black Eagles by Leslie Lee (1991) at the Manhattan Theatre Club. He was in Prelude to a Kiss at Helen Hayes Theater.

He was associate artist at California Shakespeare Theater for over twenty years. During that time acted in numerous Shakespearean plays, and he received awards for his roles as Polixenes, Orsino, Laertes, and Caesar. He was in numerous shows directed by Jonathan Moscone and Lisa Peterson.

At American Conservatory Theater, he was in several shows. He played Cleante in Tartuffe, directed by Charles Randolph-Wright. At Berkeley Repertory Theater, he was in several shows, including both The Oresteia and Major Barbara. He worked with Tony Taccone and George C. Wolfe. At Marin Theatre Company, he was in numerous shows including playing Walter in Swimmers and James in Circle Mirror Transformation.

Callender has numerous regional acting credits, including work at San Jose Stage Company, Aurora Theater, Arena Stage, Thick Description, and Portland Stage. He received Helen Hayes Award nominations for his roles in Oak and Ivy and Playboy of the West Indies at Arena Stage. In 1998, at Williamstown Theatre Festival he played Agamemnon in Hecuba with Olympia Dukakis in the title role, directed by Carey Perloff. In 1986, he played Caliban in The Tempest at Classic Stage Company, directed by Julie Taymor, and in 2022, played Prospero at Elm Shakespeare Company in New Haven.

In 2023, he was lauded for playing all three roles in the play, including Louis Armstrong, in Satchmo at the Waldorf, directed by Terry Teachout at San Jose Stage Company.

=== Directing ===
He directed Word for Word's French tour of The Guilded Six Bits, a stage version of the Zora Neale Hurston short story. He has directed shows at San Jose Stage Company and Aurora Theater Company in Berkeley.

At American Stage Company in St. Petersburg, Florida, he has directed mostly contemporary work, including August Wilson's Jitney (2016), Joe Turner’s Come and Gone (2017), Lorraine Hansberry's A Raisin in the Sun (2018), and Dominique Morisseau's Pipeline (2019), and Skeleton Crew (2020). In 2021, he directed Romeo & Juliet in America.

=== African-American Shakespeare Company ===
At AASC, Callender has directed numerous shows. In 2013, he directed AASC's annual production of Cinderella.

He has directed modern and contemporary plays such as A Raisin in the Sun (2012), Cat on a Hot Tin Roof (2013), Jitney (2017), A Streetcar Named Desire (2018), and Black Eagles (2019).

Callender has directed a number of Shakespeare plays, including Twelfth Night (2011), Much Ado About Nothing (2014), The Winter’s Tale (2017), Macbeth (2019) in the modern-verse translation by Migdalia Cruz. and Richard II (2022).

At AASC, he has acted as well. He played the lead in Othello in a modern dress production (2019), Richard III, Antony in Antony and Cleopatra, and Becker in Jitney. In 2023, he was slated to play Willy Loman in the mostly-Black production of Death of a Salesman (directed by Ted Lange), but the production was canceled on the day of its first performance when actor Richard D. May (who was playing Uncle Ben) was killed. The production was riddled with issues, including Ted Lange's departure and L. Peter Callender filling the role as both Willy and director. Though May's death significantly affected the production, it was not the sole factor for the production's cancelation.

=== Playwriting ===
In 2020, he debuted his first play, Strange Courtesies, at a reading in the New Play Festival at American Stage in Florida. It had its first bull production in 2023 at San Jose Stage, directed by Greg Homann.

== Teaching ==
Callender is also a Visiting Instructor at Stanford University teaching Acting Shakespeare and Fundamentals of Directing. He has also taught a Master Class at Emory University. At San Francisco School of the Arts, he directed Dinner at Eight and Glengarry Glen Ross.

== Awards ==
- Theatre Tampa Bay Award, Outstanding Director, Joe Turner’s Come and Gone (2017)
- Theatre Tampa Bay Award, Outstanding Director, Jitney (2016)
- Theatre Tampa Bay Award, Outstanding Director, Skeleton Crew (2020)
- Dean Goodman Award, Outstanding Lead Actor, The Winter's Tale, Twelfth Night, Julius Caesar
- San Francisco Bay Guardian GOLDIE Award, Best Actor, Joe Louis Blues (2000)
- Bay Area Critics Circle Award, Best Actor, Driving Miss Daisy (2011), World Music
- Theatre Bay Area (TBA) Award, Outstanding Principal Actor, Master Harold and the Boys(2016)
- Theatre Bay Area (TBA) Award, Outstanding Featured Actor, Swimmers (2016)
- Helen Hayes Award (nomination), Outstanding Actor, Oak and Ivy, Playboy of the West Indies
