= Terry Teachout =

American writer (1956–2022)

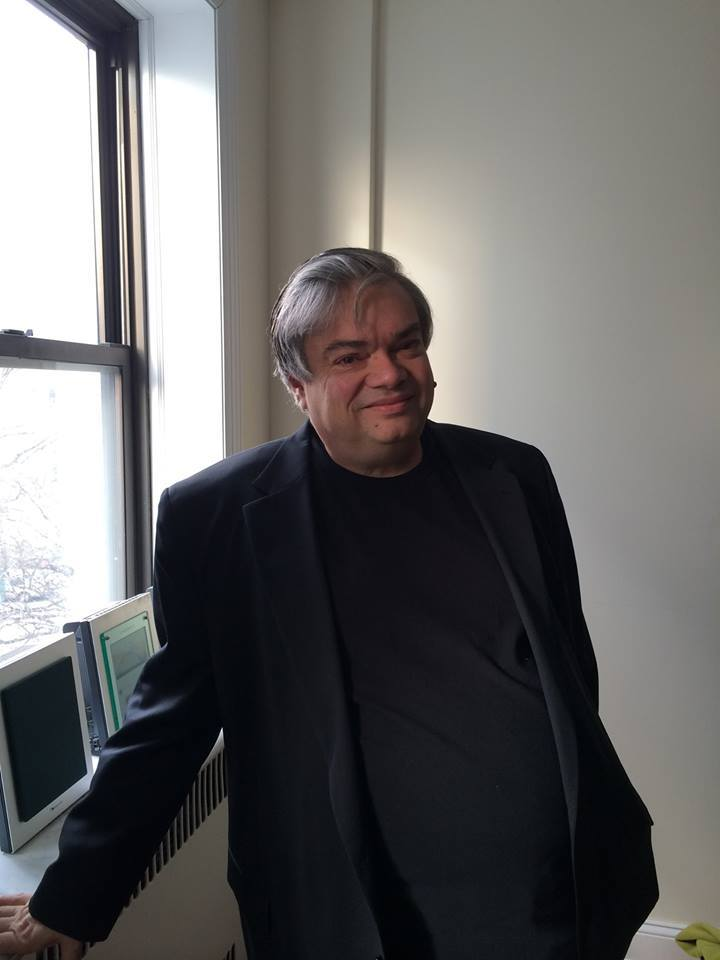
- Teachout in 2014
- Born: Terrance Alan Teachout; February 6, 1956; Cape Girardeau, Missouri, U.S.
- Died: January 13, 2022 (aged 65); Smithtown, New York, U.S.
- Education: William Jewell College (BA)
- Occupations: Writer; director; podcaster
- Spouses: Liz Cullers (divorced); Hilary Dyson (m. 2007; died 2020)
- Writing career
- Years active: 1979–2022
- Genres: Criticism; biography
- Subjects: Theatre; music

Terrance Alan Teachout (February 6, 1956 – January 13, 2022) was an American author, critic, biographer, playwright, stage director, and librettist.

He was the drama critic of The Wall Street Journal, the critic-at-large of Commentary, and the author of "Sightings", a column about the arts in the U.S. that was published biweekly in The Wall Street Journal. He weblogged at About Last Night and wrote about the arts for many other magazines and newspapers, including The New York Times and National Review. He was a co-host on Three on the Aisle, a monthly podcast about theater in the United States, hosted by American Theatre magazine, which ran from September 2017 to December 2021.

== Early life ==
Terrance Alan Teachout was born on February 6, 1956, in Cape Girardeau, Missouri, the oldest son of Herbert H. Teachout, a hardware salesman, and Evelyn Teachout (née Crosno), a secretary. He grew up in Sikeston, Missouri.

Teachout attended St. John's College in Annapolis, Maryland, but left after one semester. He received a BA in journalism and music from William Jewell College in Liberty, Missouri, in 1979 and attended the University of Illinois Urbana-Champaign from 1983 to 1985, in a graduate psychology program, but left to pursue his journalism career.

== Career ==
=== Journalism ===
From 1979 to 1983, Teachout lived in Kansas City, Missouri, where he worked as a bank teller and jazz bassist; during this period, he also wrote about music for The Kansas City Star. In 1985, Teachout relocated to New York City, where he worked as an editor at Harper's Magazine from 1985 to 1987 and an editorial writer for the New York Daily News from 1987 to 1993. From 1993 to 2000 Teachout was the classical music and dance critic at the Daily News.

In 2003, Teachout became the drama critic for The Wall Street Journal. He was also critic-at-large for the magazine Commentary.

=== Books ===
External videos
- Presentation by Teachout on The Skeptic, November 11, 2002, C-SPAN
- Presentation by Teachout on Pops, January 7, 2010, C-SPAN
- Q&A interview with Teachout on Pops, January 31, 2010, C-SPAN

Teachout's books include All in the Dances: A Brief Life of George Balanchine (2004), which was "highly recommended" by Publishers Weekly, A Terry Teachout Reader (2004), which Publishers Weekly called "an impressive testament to Teachout's talents, eloquence and integrity," The Skeptic: A Life of H. L. Mencken (2002), and City Limits: Memories of a Small-Town Boy (1991).

Teachout was the editor of Beyond the Boom: New Voices on American Life, Culture, and Politics (1990), which featured an introduction by Tom Wolfe, and Ghosts on the Roof: Selected Journalism of Whittaker Chambers, 1931–1959 (1989).

In 1992, Teachout discovered the manuscript of A Second Mencken Chrestomathy among H. L. Mencken's private papers and edited it for publication by Alfred A. Knopf in 1995.

In 2009, Teachout published Pops: A Life of Louis Armstrong. "With Pops, his eloquent and important new biography of Armstrong, the critic and cultural historian Terry Teachout restores this jazzman to his deserved place in the pantheon of American artists," Michiko Kakutani wrote in her New York Times review of the book. The Washington Post chose Pops as one of the ten best books of 2009, The Economist chose it as one of the best books of the year, and the New York Times Book Review chose it as one of the "100 notable books" of 2010.

In 2013, Teachout's biography Duke: A Life of Duke Ellington was published. Duke was longlisted for the National Book Awards nonfiction prize. James Gavin, writing in the New York Times Book Review, called Duke a "cleareyed reassessment of a man regarded in godlike terms" that "humanizes a man whom history has kept on a pedestal", praising its "sound scholarship and easy readability." Kirkus Reviews called it “an instant classic…Teachout solidifies his place as one of America’s great music biographers.” Publishers Weekly called it “revealing…Teachout neatly balances colorful anecdote with shrewd character assessments and musicological analysis.”

=== Theater ===
Satchmo at the Waldorf, Teachout's one-man-two-character play about Louis Armstrong and his manager Joe Glaser, was premiered at Orlando Shakespeare Theater's Mandell Theatre in Orlando, Florida, on September 15, 2011, in a production starring Dennis Neal and directed by Rus Blackwell. An extensively revised version of Satchmo at the Waldorf in which Miles Davis is also briefly portrayed was produced by Shakespeare & Company of Lenox, Massachusetts, in August 2012, with John Douglas Thompson playing Armstrong, Glaser, and Davis. The production, which transferred to Long Wharf Theatre of New Haven, Connecticut, in October 2012, and to Philadelphia's Wilma Theater in November 2012, was directed by Gordon Edelstein.

The Boston Globe described the revised version of the play as a "tour de force.... Aided by director Gordon Edelstein and the consummately skilled Thompson as interpreter, Teachout—in his debut as dramatist rather than drama critic—has contributed a work of insight and power." According to the New York Times, "Reviewing a play is one thing; writing a play is quite another. Terry Teachout, drama critic for The Wall Street Journal, makes this hat-switching look far easier than it is with his first play.... Mr. Teachout has done a fine job of building a fiction-plus-fact theater piece."

Satchmo at the Waldorf transferred to New York City's Westside Theatre, an off-Broadway venue, on March 4, 2014. It closed there on June 29, 2014, after 18 previews and 136 performances. According to The New Yorker, "Teachout, Thompson, and the director, Gordon Edelstein, together create an extraordinarily rich and complex characterization. The show centers on the trumpeter’s relationship with his Mob-connected Jewish manager of more than thirty-five years, Joe Glaser. Thompson forcefully inhabits both men—and throws in a chilling Miles Davis—delivering an altogether riveting performance." Thompson won the 2013–14 Outer Critics Circle Award and Drama Desk Award for "Outstanding Solo Performance" for his performance in the play. It was produced at the Wallis Annenberg Center for the Performing Arts in Beverly Hills, California in May 2015, and at Chicago's Court Theatre, Colorado Springs' Theatreworks, Palm Beach Dramaworks, the Seacoast Repertory Theatre of ]Portsmouth, New Hampshire, and San Francisco's American Conservatory Theater during the 2015–16 season. It was produced by New Venture Theatre of Baton Rouge, La., Triangle Productions of Portland, Ore., B Street Theatre of Sacramento, California, and the Mosaic Theater Company of Washington, D.C., during the 2016–17 season. The Palm Beach Dramaworks production was directed by Teachout in his professional debut as a stage director. On February 24, 2018, Satchmo opened at the Alley Theatre of Houston in a production directed by Teachout that ran through March 18, 2018; it was performed by Jerome Preston Bates.

Teachout's second play, Billy and Me, a four-character-three-actor play about the relationship between William Inge and Tennessee Williams, premiered at Palm Beach Dramaworks in West Palm Beach, Florida, on December 8, 2017.

=== Libretti ===
Teachout also wrote the libretti for three operas by Paul Moravec: The Letter, an opera based on the 1927 play by W. Somerset Maugham that was premiered on July 25, 2009, by the Santa Fe Opera; Danse Russe, a one-act backstage comedy about the making of Igor Stravinsky's The Rite of Spring that was premiered by Philadelphia's Center City Opera Theater on April 28, 2011; and The King's Man, a one-act companion piece to Danse Russe about Benjamin Franklin and his illegitimate son William that was premiered by Louisville's Kentucky Opera on a double bill with Danse Russe on October 11, 2013. In addition, Teachout was the librettist for Moravec's cantata "Music, Awake!," which was premiered at Rollins College by the Bach Festival Society of Winter Park (Florida) on April 16, 2016.

== Other work ==
Teachout wrote the forewords to Paul Taylor's Private Domain: An Autobiography (1999, University of Pittsburgh Press), Elaine Dundy's The Dud Avocado (2007, New York Review Books Classics), William Bailey's William Bailey on Canvas (2007, Betty Cuningham Gallery), and Richard Stark's Flashfire and Firebreak (2011, University of Chicago Press) and contributed to The Oxford Companion to Jazz (2000, Oxford University Press), Field-Tested Books (2008, Coudal Partners), and Robert Gottlieb's Reading Dance (2008, Pantheon). He also appears in Alex Gibney's Sinatra: All or Nothing at All (2015) and two film documentaries about dance, Mirra Bank's Last Dance (2002) and Deborah Novak's Steven Caras: See Them Dance (2011).

Teachout contributed notes on recordings by Louis Armstrong, Gene Krupa and Oscar Peterson to Jazz: The Smithsonian Anthology (2011) and wrote liner notes for CDs by jazz musicians Karrin Allyson, Gene Bertoncini, Ruby Braff and Ellis Larkins, Julia Dollison, Jim Ferguson, Roger Kellaway, Diana Krall, Joe Mooney, Marian McPartland, Mike Metheny, Maria Schneider, Kendra Shank and Luciana Souza, the pop-jazz Lascivious Biddies, the bluegrass band Nickel Creek, the Alec Wilder Octet, and the classical ensembles Chanticleer and the Trio Solisti, as well as for the original-cast album of Hands on a Hardbody.

== Politics ==
The New York Times described Teachout as a conservative who was "an acolyte of William F. Buckley Jr. and Norman Podhoretz", though he did not believe his political views should overtly influence his criticism. In the 1990s, he was a founding member of The Vile Body, a social club of right-wing intellectuals from the fields of publishing and journalism in New York City.

Writing in The Nation, Jeet Heer said about Teachout, "He got his start with National Review but eventually embraced a more philosophical and nonpolitical strain of conservatism [...] his work addressed a wider audience and eschewed the liberal-baiting that dominates right-wing political discourse". He further described Teachout as a "Never Trump conservative" whose beliefs were both traditionalist and cosmopolitan.

== Personal life and death ==
In 2005, Teachout was diagnosed with congestive heart failure. He lived in Upper Manhattan. He was married twice, first to Liz Cullers, until their divorce, and then to the former Hilary Dyson from 2007 until her death in 2020. In June 2021, he began a relationship with Cheril Mulligan.

Teachout died in his sleep on January 13, 2022, at the age of 65, at the home of a friend in Smithtown, New York.

== Membership ==
- 2004–2010: National Endowment for the Arts, National Council on the Arts

== Awards and honors ==
- 2012: MacDowell Colony to write Duke and Satchmo at the Waldorf
- 2012: Guggenheim Fellowship to write Duke
- 2014: Bradley Foundation, Bradley Prize

== Works and publications ==
=== Books ===
- Teachout, Terry, ed. (1989). Ghosts on the Roof: Selected Journalism of Whittaker Chambers, 1931–1959. Washington, D.C.: Regnery Gateway. ISBN 978-0-895-26765-8. OCLC 20130686.
- Teachout, Terry; Wolfe, Tom (introduction by) (1990). Teachout, Terry (ed.). Beyond the Boom: New Voices on American Life, Culture, and Politics. New York: Poseidon Press. ISBN 978-0-671-68639-0. OCLC 22003863.
- Teachout, Terry (1991). City Limits: Memories of a Small-Town Boy. New York: Poseidon Press. ISBN 978-0-671-68351-1. OCLC 24219089.
- Mencken, H. L. (1995). A Second Mencken Chrestomathy. New York: Alfred A. Knopf. ISBN 978-0-307-83111-8. OCLC 301131151.
- Teachout, Terry (2002). The Skeptic: The Life of H.L. Mencken. New York: HarperCollins. ISBN 978-0-060-50528-8. OCLC 779071436.
- Teachout, Terry (2004). A Terry Teachout Reader. New Haven: Yale University Press. ISBN 978-0-300-09894-5. OCLC 52750171.
- Teachout, Terry (2004). All in the Dances: A Brief Life of George Balanchine. Orlando, FL: Harcourt. ISBN 978-0-151-01088-2. OCLC 55016196.
- Teachout, Terry (2009). Pops: A Life of Louis Armstrong. Boston: Houghton Mifflin Harcourt. ISBN 978-0-151-01089-9. OCLC 758783092.
- Teachout, Terry (2013). Duke: A Life of Duke Ellington. New York: Gotham Books. ISBN 978-1-592-40749-1. OCLC 917157658.

=== Plays ===
- Teachout, Terry (2015). Satchmo at the Waldorf. New York: Dramatists Play Service Inc. ISBN 978-0-822-23157-8. OCLC 920019459.
- Teachout, Terry (2017). Billy and Me.

=== Libretti ===
- Teachout, Terry; Moravec, Paul (2009). The Letter.
- Teachout, Terry; Moravec, Paul (2012). Danse Russe: A Vaudeville in One Act. Verona, NJ: Subito Music. ISBN 978-0151010899. OCLC 948518489.
- Teachout, Terry; Moravec, Paul (2013). The King's Man.
- Teachout, Terry; Moravec, Paul (2016). Music, Awake!.
