= Jerome Preston Bates =

American actor

- Born: Augusta, Georgia, USA
- Other names: Jerome Bates
- Occupation(s): Actor - TV, Film and Theater

Jerome Preston Bates is an American theater, film and television actor, director and playwright.

Bates was born in Augusta, Georgia. The family moved to the New York/New Jersey area when he was six but returned to Georgia when Bates began high school.

== Theater credits ==
=== Broadway ===
August Wilson's Jitney, Directed by Ruben Santiago-Hudson (Manhattan Theater Club, Tony Award for Best Revival of a Play), Stick Fly, Directed by Kenny Leon (Lyceum Theatre); August Wilson's Seven Guitars, Directed by Lloyd Richards (Walter Kerr Theatre).

=== Off-Broadway ===
Beckett Theatre, Abingdon Theatre, The Public Theater, Circle Repertory Company, The Negro Ensemble Company, New Federal Theatre. Regional: Floyd Barton in Seven Guitars opposite Viola Davis (world premiere, Goodman Theatre); Fences (Denver Center Theatre Company); King Lear (Folger Theatre); Yale Repertory Theatre, Long Wharf Theatre, Wilma Theatre, Alliance Theatre, Centerstage, Hartford Stage, Peoples’ Light & Theatre Company, Philadelphia Theatre Company, Philadelphia Drama Guild.

Jerome Preston Bates has played Louis Armstrong and Joe Glaser in the one-person play "Satchmo at the Waldorf" by Terry Teachout. During the play the impersonation of Miles Davis takes place.

=== TV/Film ===
Oz, All My Children, Law & Order, Third Watch, Lights Out, NYPD Blue, New York Undercover, Shaft 2000, Musical Chairs, It Runs in the Family, The Out-of-Towners, Tio Papi, Peeples, Romeo and Juliet in Harlem, Incoming Freshmen.

=== Directing ===
The entire August Wilson Century Cycle (Lucy Craft Laney Museum of Black History, Georgia), Oedipus Rex (Times Square Arts Center).

=== Awards ===
Six Audelco Awards, including Herald Loomis in Joe Turner’s Come and Gone; Carter G. Woodson Award.

Authorship: Electric Lady, Augusta Brown, Mr. Unemployed, Jimi Hendrix (screenplay).

Training: LAMDA (London, UK), HB Studio, University of Tennessee, Knoxville College.

He has been on several Law & Order shows and he also played a corrections officer on the HBO series Oz.

On November 5, 2007, Bates took over the role of Derek Frye on the ABC soap opera, All My Children, the third actor to play that character.
