= Palm Beach Dramaworks =

Not-for-profit regional theater in Florida

- Type: Regional theater
- Founded: 2000
- Headquarters: 201 Clematis St., West Palm Beach, Florida
- Key people: William Hayes (Producing Artistic Director); Sue Ellen Beryl (Managing Director)
- Website: Official website

Palm Beach Dramaworks is a not-for-profit regional theater located in West Palm Beach, Florida. It has a 218 seat occupancy and produces original plays by playwrights that have included Terry Teachout, Lyle Kessler, Christopher Demos-Brown, and Jenny Connell Davis. It has produced 120 classic shows and concert versions of musicals.

== History ==
Palm Beach Dramaworks opened in 2000. The vision for the theater was conceived by William Hayes, Sue Ellen Beryl and Nanique Gheridian who wanted to bring a regional theater to West Palm Beach and provide opportunities for more Florida-based talent. The theater began within Palm Beach Atlantic University with its performance of Greetings! by playwright Tom Dudzick. In its infancy, it featured plays by playwrights that included Edward Albee and Jean-Paul Sartre.

Palm Beach Dramaworks moved to another location in West Palm Beach in 2003, and held performances in a total of three prior locations before moving to the Cuillo Centre for the Arts in West Palm Beach in 2011. After a capital campaign raising over 4 million dollars, the location went through a $2 million renovation and was named the Don & Ann Brown Theatre.

In 2014, the theater opened the Dramaworkshop, a lab that provides resources and support for playwrights to develop scripts. One production released from Dramaworkshop was Lyle Kessler's House on Fire which premiered at the theater in 2019. It also launched its play festival in 2019 (later named the Perlberg Festival of New Plays) which included four plays out of 300 submissions to the theater. It named Jenny Connell Davis in 2023 as its first resident playwright and also named Anne Mundell as its new Resident Scenic Designer.

As of 2026, Palm Beach Dramaworks has produced 120 classic shows and concert versions of musicals. It has also produced nine world premieres from playwrights that have included Michael McKeever, Christopher Demos-Brown, and Jenny Connell Davis.

== Venue ==
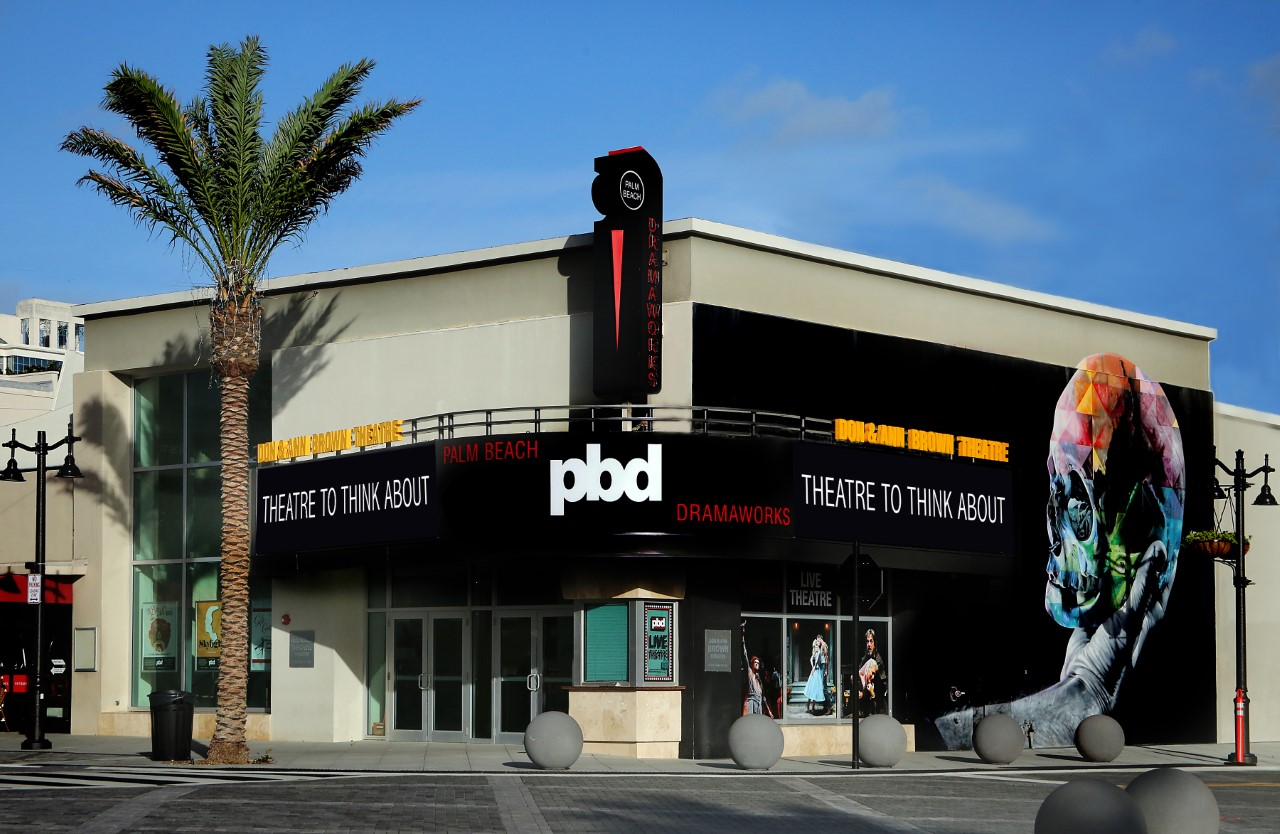
Street view of Palm Beach Dramaworks in West Palm Beach, Florida.

Since 2011, Palm Beach Dramaworks has operated on Clematis Street in West Palm Beach with 218 seat capacity. The building is in a historic district and was originally the Florida Theatre which operated as a movie house from 1949 to 1981, thereafter operating as a stage and training theater prior to being purchased by Palm Beach Dramaworks. Called one of the top ten regional theaters in the United States by The Wall Street Journal, Palm Beach

Dramaworks also offers educational programs for students and adults.

== Select production history ==
=== Classic plays ===
- 2008-09, The Chairs by Eugène Ionesco
- 2009-10, Copenhagen by Michael Frayn
- 2010-11, Freud's Last Session by Mark St. Germain
- 2011-12, All My Sons by Arthur Miller
- 2014-15, A Delicate Balance by Edward Albee
- 2022-23, August: Osage County by Tracy Letts

=== New commissioned works and world premieres ===
- 2017-18, Billy & Me by Terry Teachout
- 2017-18, Edgar & Emily by Joseph McDonough
- 2018-19, House on Fire by Lyle Kessler
- 2019-20, Ordinary Americans by Joseph McDonough
- 2021-22, The People Downstairs by Michael McKeever
- 2021-22, The Duration by Bruce Graham
- 2022-23, The Science of Leaving Omaha by Carter W. Lewis
- 2023-24, The Messenger by Jenny Connell Davis
- 2023-24, The Cancellation of Lauren Fein by Christopher Demos-Brown
