= False Friends (Homeland) =

- Homeland episode
- Episode no.: Season 8 Episode 3
- Directed by: Keith Gordon
- Written by: Alex Gansa; Howard Gordon
- Production code: 8WAH03
- Original air date: February 23, 2020
- Running time: 52 minutes

Guest appearances
- Sam Trammell as Vice President Ben Hayes; Elham Ehsas as Jalal Haqqani; Andrea Deck as Jenna Bragg; Cliff Chamberlain as Mike Dunne; Charles Brice as Staff Sergeant John Durkin; Sam Chance as Specialist Drew Soto; Octavio Rodriguez as Specialist Arturo Gonzales; Jason Tottenham as Alan Yager; Seear Kohi as Balach; Eugene Lee as General Mears; Beau Bridges as President Ralph Warner

Episode chronology
← Previous "Catch and Release"	Next → "Chalk One Up"
- Homeland season 8

"False Friends" is the third episode of the eighth season of the American television drama series Homeland, and the 87th episode overall. It premiered on Showtime on February 23, 2020.

== Plot ==
After initially suspecting Saul (Mandy Patinkin), Haqqani (Numan Acar) becomes convinced that the ISI was responsible for the ambush on his convoy. Saul states that there had to have been a traitor in Haqqani's camp in order for the ISI to have known about the meeting. Haqqani's suspicions turn to his last living son, Jalal (Elham Ehsas), who has been adamantly opposed to the peace talks. Those suspicions are confirmed when Jalal places a call to Tasneem (Nimrat Kaur) on an open line while Haqqani is monitoring his communications.

Carrie (Claire Danes) agrees to a meeting with Yevgeny (Costa Ronin). Still questioning Carrie's allegiance, Mike (Cliff Chamberlain) and Jenna (Andrea Deck) attempt to eavesdrop from nearby but are unsuccessful as Yevgeny has arranged to meet outside a mosque precisely when prayers are being broadcast over loudspeaker. Yevgeny alludes to a meaningful relationship the two shared in Moscow. Carrie has no memory of it and challenges Yevgeny to prove it by telling her something private. She is disquieted when Yevgeny reveals his knowledge that Carrie once considered drowning her daughter Franny. Back at the station, Carrie lies to Mike about her conversation, framing it as Yevgeny potentially being recruited as a CIA asset.

Haqqani confronts Jalal who remains defiant and refuses to confess outright to his treachery. Haqqani spares Jalal's life, but exiles him from the family. Saul and Haqqani begin negotiations and eventually agree to terms on a peace deal which includes an immediate ceasefire. Jalal wanders the streets until he is found and picked up by Tasneem.

== Production ==
The episode was directed by Keith Gordon, and co-written by showrunner Alex Gansa and executive producer Howard Gordon.

== Reception ==
=== Reviews ===
New York Magazine's Brian Tallerico rated the episode 4 out of 5 stars, and added: "The episode's best scene may be the one between Carrie and Jenna on the roof, in which Carrie explains how you can never really know if someone is just trying to sow dissent and chaos or genuinely coming to your side".

Scott Von Doviak of The A.V. Club gave the episode a "B" grade, calling it "an episode steeped in traitorous behavior and rampant paranoia".

=== Ratings ===
The original broadcast was watched by 710,000 viewers.
