= Alpesh Patel =

Indian-American filmmaker and producer (born 1972)

Alpesh Patel (born February 1972) is an Indian-American filmmaker and producer.

== Background ==
Patel was born in India. At a very young age, he loved to go to Bollywood with his father. He emigrated to the United States with his parents at the age of 7 in 1979. He continues to be fascinated by movies.

After graduating from Penn State's film program, Patel worked for Cerebellum Corporation shooting and directing Standard Deviants videos. He later moved to Los Angeles, where he runs VisionStorm Entertainment as a vehicle to make his films.

== Career ==
In 2003, Patel wrote, directed, and produced the feature film, Graduation Night, as a coming-of-age romantic comedy. The film played at several notable film festivals under the titles Party On and Truth or Dare, and it is now in distribution in the US as Graduation Night. The film stars Adrian R'Mante, Abigail Spencer, Kevin Alejandro, and Playboy Playmate Irina Voronina.

His 2006 screenplay for Blind Ambition was produced and won several awards in the festival circuit. The film stars Vanessa Angel, Christopher Atkins, and Bollywood screen star Gulshan Grover.

In 2007, Patel's mockumentary Touch Wood went into production as a comical behind-the-scenes look at the adult film industry told in mock documentary style. Touch Wood was Patel's second feature film as a director and stars Gerry Bednob and Tony Sano.

He has also worked in post-production as film editor for TV shows, including The 5th Wheel, Ghost Hunters, Southern Steel, Dirty Jobs, Bounty Girls: Miami, Ghost Hunters International, Unsolved Mysteries, BattleBots, Penn & Teller: Bullshit!, and The Ultimate Fighter.

== Partial filmography ==
- English Grammar: The Standard Deviants (1999) (V) (director)
- Graduation Night (aka Truth and Dare, Party On) (2003) (director & writer)
- Blind Ambition (2008) (written by)
- Touch Wood (2009) (director & writer)
- Devil's Door (2014) (producer & director)

== Awards and nominations ==
- 2001, Audience Award, Party On, Slamdance Film Festival
- 2008, IFFF 'Spirit' Award, Blind Ambition, International Family Film Festival
- 2008, Festival Prize, Blind Ambition, Long Island International Film Expo
