= African-American Shakespeare Company =

Theatre company in San Francisco

- Location: San Francisco, California, US
- Founded: 1994; 32 years ago
- Founded by: Sherri Young
- Type of plays: Shakespeare and contemporary American
- Website: www.african-americanshakes.org

The African-American Shakespeare Company (AASC) is a 501(c)3 nonprofit professional regional theatre company in San Francisco, California. Since its founding in 1994 Sherri Young has been its Executive Director and in 2009 L. Peter Callender joined as its Artistic Director.

AASC is a member of the Shakespeare Theatre Association.

== History ==
Sherri Young, a graduate of the American Conservatory Theater's Master of Fine Arts Program in 1992, believed there was a problem with theatre companies and color-blind casting as well as the "expectation that they [actors of color] would stick to 'black plays' when they graduated". Young thought this was "inconceivable and unacceptable" which motivated her to create the African-American Shakespeare Company to provide opportunities for actors of color in mastering classical theatre. At the time, the Black-identified companies in the Bay Area were the Lorraine Hansberry Theatre, the Oakland Ensemble Theatre, and the Black Repertory Group.

=== Artistic Direction: Sherri Young ===
Sherri Young is on the board of Handful Players, a children's musical theatre, and was previously Commissioner for the San Francisco Arts Commission where she was appointed by Gavin Newsom. In 2006, she “won a full scholarship from Americans for the Arts” to attend their annual conference.

During her time as Artistic Director and through the present, Sherri Young has acted and directed in AASC plays. Notable shows that she directed include the 1997 production of Oedipus Rex in association with Mills College’s theater department, in which Young shifted the location of the action to Seregenti, Tanzania and her 2017 A Midsummer Night's Dream set in the West Indies (Trinidad and Tobago) that included puppetry. Young often directs the annual Cinderella. She played Mrs. Candour in The School for Scandal, the AASC production staged at Mills College in 1998 and Mistress Quickly in The Merry Wives of Windsor.

Victoria Evans Erville served as Artistic Director briefly during the transition from Sherri Young to L. Peter Callender.

=== Artistic Direction: L. Peter Callender ===
L. Peter Callender joined the company as its Artistic Director in 2009. The first show he directed for AASC was his 2011 Twelfth Night set in a “1940s San Francisco of film noir and jazz”. He also directed a Julius Caesar set in postcolonial Africa in 2012, and the 2014 digitally-inflected The Tempest, with Ariel as an app.

Callender has directed numerous non-Shakespearean plays including A Raisin in the Sun in 2012, Cat on a Hot Tin Roof in 2013, and the lauded 2018 production of A Streetcar Named Desire.

AASC’s 20th season (2014–15) included four shows, all directed by women, including the celebrated production of Medea by Euripides, directed by Dawn Monique Williams.

The AASC received NEA support for their 2014 production of Xtigone by Nambi E. Kelly. In 2016, Callender, Michael Gene Sullivan, and Velina Brown each directed different scenes of George C. Wolfe’s The Colored Museum in order to offer different perspectives.

In 2016, Callender directed at San Jose Stage Company and he currently is associate artist at California Shakespeare Theater. He also continues to perform at Berkeley Repertory Theater and Marin Theatre Company. He played Antony in the AASC production of Antony and Cleopatra in 2016, directed by Jon Tracy. He played the title role in AASC’s production of Richard III in 2018, directed by Kristen Brandt.

== Location ==
AASC is a resident organization at the city-owned African American Art and Culture Complex (AAACC) with its office located at 762 Fulton Street Suite 306 in San Francisco, California, 94102. Since 2002, it has staged its productions at the 200-seat Buriel Clay Theater located on the ground floor of the AAACC building with an annual audience of over 7,500 patrons.

Some productions have been in other locations, such as their 2005 Much Ado About Nuthin! at the African American Art and Culture Complex, the 2007 annual “British panto-style” Cinderella at Yerba Buena Center for the Arts' Zeum Theater.

For its 2016–17 season, it moved its productions from the Buriel Clay Theater to the San Francisco War Memorial and Performing Arts Center's Herbst Theatre for Cinderella, Marines' Memorial Theatre for August Wilson's Jitney, and San Francisco Opera's Taube Atrium Theatre for William Shakespeare's The Winter's Tale. Callender states the reason for the move was due to "the business operations model of the Complex has changed under the new leadership, which has made it increasingly difficult to produce our works. The leadership has reduced our rehearsal time, tech time, and preview times."

== Productions ==
Its signature production of the classic Cinderella fairytale is an annual holiday tradition. ‘’Cinderella’’ is staged by different directors and continuously updated. The annual show began in 2000. The 2016 version included more dance, and Sherri Young directed a feminist version of it in 2017.

In addition to Cinderella, AASC typically produces two Shakespearean plays and one play by a contemporary playwright each season. Seasons begin in September/October and lasts through May/June.

Past productions includes William Shakespeare's Othello, Antony and Cleopatra, The Comedy of Errors, Julius Caesar, The Merry Wives of Windsor, Romeo and Juliet, The Taming of the Shrew, The Tempest, and Twelfth Night; Tennessee Williams' Cat on a Hot Tin Roof; and George C. Wolfe's The Colored Museum.

== Shake-It-Up Arts Education Program ==
AASC offers an arts education program called Shake-It-Up. The goal of the program is to provide students with skills of tackling complex reading and strengthening comprehension skills through theatre techniques and games in a positive and creative environment. These are done through workshops which educators sign-up for and professional educators/artists lead the sessions. In addition, AASC offers free student matinees for public schools where more than 2,200 students and their chaperones from all over the San Francisco Bay Area attend each season. AASC also offers educators a Teacher's Night Out event for preview performances where educators can attend at no cost.

== The Cultural Corridor ==
Since 2015, AASC has hosted an annual free community outdoor performance series in the Fillmore District, Western Addition, and Hayes Valley neighborhoods of San Francisco known as The Cultural Corridor. The goal of the series is to unite performing arts groups in the neighborhood and highlight the cultural diversity of the area. The series began in September/October 2015 with three one-hour performances at the Fillmore Mini Park (Fillmore St between Turk St and Golden Gate Ave) leading up to the main three-hour performance at the PROXY open space (Hayes St and Octavia Blvd). In 2016, it added another location to the performance series at Buchanan Street Mall (Buchanan St and McAllister St) and three additional one-hour performances. Participants included AfroSolo, The San Francisco Bay Area Theatre Company, Nitty Dupree Studio of Dance, Cultural Odyssey: The Medea Project, SambaFunk!, SFJAZZ, San Francisco Ballet, San Francisco Conservatory of Music, Alumni and Friends of the San Francisco Youth Symphony, and Citizen Film.

== Partnerships ==
AASC partners with various organizations in the San Francisco Bay Area throughout the years. Macy's was a sponsor of its Cinderella student matinees and offered special invitation to AASC supporters to various events such as Black History Month celebration events at their Union Square store. AASC partnered with the Golden Thread Productions to produce Isfahan Blues, a story inspired by Duke Ellington's tour of Iran in 1963. In 2015 for its production of Romeo & Juliet, it partnered with Oakland School for the Arts to cast teen actors in title and supporting roles as well as Litquake for their Teenquake programming. AASC has also collaborated with the San Francisco Opera for their Cinderella exploration workshop for families.

== Awards ==
- 2013 San Francisco Bay Area Theatre Critics Circle Paine Knickerbocker Award
- 2014 Theatre Bay Area Outstanding Performance by a Female Actor in a Principal Role in a Play – Leontyne Mbele-Mbong, Medea

== See also ==
- American Conservatory Theater, San Francisco, California
- San Francisco Playhouse, San Francisco, California
- California Shakespeare Theater, Orinda, California
- Marin Theatre Company, Mill Valley, California
- Marin Shakespeare Company
- Aurora Theatre Company, Berkeley, California
- Berkeley Repertory Theatre, Berkeley, California
