= Steven Caras: See Them Dance =

Television Documentary

Steven Caras: See Them Dance is a public television documentary directed by Deborah Novak. It concerns the life and work of former New York City Ballet dancer, Steven Caras, who drew upon his practical experience as a dancer to become a perceptive dance photographer. Focusing on Caras' difficulties in becoming a professional dancer, the film explores the complexities of ballet and profiles the father of ballet in America, George Balanchine.

== Synopsis ==
Against a backdrop of the ballet world in the 1960s and 1970s, this feature-length documentary traces the life and times of dancer/photographer Steven Caras. Despite bullying at school and parental rejection at home, Caras pursued his dream of becoming a dancer and was invited by George Balanchine to join the New York City Ballet. Balanchine also took note of Caras's talent as a photographer and granted him privileged access to photograph all aspects of City Ballet's private world. Ultimately, Caras created over 100,000 images including "Last Bow" depicting Balanchine's final curtain call.

== Interviews ==
Dancers and choreographers interviewed include Peter Martins, Jacques D'Amboise, Mia Michaels, Allegra Kent, Patricia McBride, Jean-Pierre Bonnefoux, Sean Lavery, Elizabeth Streb, Virginia Johnson, and Gary Chryst. Comments on the historical importance of Caras' photographs are provided by Terry Teachout, Sara Morthland, and Jacqueline Davis.

== Credits ==
Produced by Witek & Novak, Inc. Directed by Deborah Novak Executive Producer, Scott Wallin, Arizona PBS Videographers - Paul Piasecki, Adam Shanker Music - Jay Flippin Editor and Technical Director - Eric Himes Art Direction and Digital Effects - Carol Delgrosso
