= Standard Deviants =

- Created by: Chip Paucek and James Rena

Production
- Production company: Cerebellum Corporation

Original release
- Release: 1994 – 2003

Standard Deviants (originally The Standard Deviants) is a series of educational videos produced in the United States. The name also referred to the troupe of actors and comedians who presented the series. The series is owned by Cerebellum Corporation, founded in the Washington, D.C., area by George Washington University alumni Chip Paucek and James Rena, who created the series to help students learn using humor. As such, the series blended essential information with humorous examples and comic sketches. For example, the English punctuation video illustrates the usage of exclamation points through a sketch in which two characters excitedly play Battleship. The series was originally targeted at college students, but its intended audience became progressively younger over time, eventually described as "for junior high, high school, college and beyond".

The original videos, which typically have running times of 1–2 hours, were later adapted into Standard Deviants TV, a series of fifty-two 26-minute episodes on PBS from 2000–2002. They were then retrofitted again into shorter videos for the K–12 school market, which as of 2024 are packaged as two lines: Standard Deviants School and Standard Deviants Teaching Systems.

Cerebellum created two other series, both short-lived. No-Brainers, described as "The Video Guides to Life", features the same cast (but without the Standard Deviants name) in videos about life skills, targeted at adults rather than students. The series comprises 12 videos, two of them adapted from Standard Deviants videos, released in 1998 and 1999. Released in 2002, Jibberboosh is a series of two videos for preschoolers.

== Cast ==
- Brad Aldous (1996–99)
- Gelila Asres (1994–2002)
- Trina Baker (2001–02)
- Amrita Bessin (1997–98)
- Mike Birbiglia (1998–99)
- Herschel Bleefeld (1997–2002)
- Ken Bon (2000)
- Andy Campbell (1999–2002)
- Strawberry Catubo (1999)
- Peggy Chang (2000–02)
- Rob Cohen (1997)
- Brian Coleman (1997)
- Misha Collins (1999)
- Diane Cooper (1998–99)
- Desmond Dutcher (1998–99)
- Matt Flanagan (1998–99)
- Ashley Fleming (1997–2000)
- Andre Fontanelle (1998)
- Tim Gore (1998–2002)
- Lara D. Hopewell (1997–2003)
- Beth Kirkpatrick (1997–99)
- Jeremy Klavens (1997–2002)
- Kristjana Knight (1998–2003)
- Michael LeFort (1994–96)
- Peter Makrauer (1997)
- Leon Mandel (1998–99)
- Jamie Marass (2002)
- Chas Mastin (1994–2000)
- Walter Mastrapa (1997–98)
- T.J. Miller (2000–03)
- Tessa Munro (1997–2002)
- Chris Noll (1997–99)
- Jennifer O'Brien (2001–02)
- Billy Portman (1997)
- Shaun Powell (1997–2000)
- Andrew Ritter (1997)
- KenYatta Rogers (1999–2003)
- Alissa Rosen (1994–96)
- Deena Rubinson (1997–99)
- Andrea Shreeman (1995–96, 1999–2002)
- Ptolemy Slocum (1998–2002)
- Gabrielle Smith (1996–97)
- Malcolm Smith (1997)
- David Sturdevant (1997–2000)
- Christy Trapp (2000)
- Shannon Ward (1997)
- Kerry Washington (1997)
- Andrew Wynn (1998–99)
- Regan Wynne (1998–99)

== Crew ==
=== Producers ===
- Lara D. Hopewell (1997–2002)
- Michael LeFort (1994–96)
- Chip Paucek (1994–2002)
- James Rena (1994–2002)
- David Sturdevant (2000–02)
- Jonathan Reich (1997-1998)

=== Directors ===
- Aldo Bello
- Robert Deege
- Joseph Doria
- Danielle Fenati
- Christopher Fetner
- Sam Genovese
- Alpesh Patel
- Jonathan Reich

== Subjects covered ==
=== Sciences and technology ===
- Anatomy (1997)
- Astronomy (1997)
- Biology (1996)
- Chemistry (1996)
  - Organic chemistry (1997)
- Dinosaurs (2001)
- Geology (1997)
- HTML (1999) (Note: Later repackaged as No-Brainers on Creating Web Pages.)
- Internet basics (1999) (Note: Later repackaged as No-Brainers on the Internet.)
- Nutrition (1998)
- Physics (1996, rev. 1998)

=== Mathematics ===
- Algebra (1996)
  - Pre-algebra (1998)
- Basic math (1997)
- Calculus (1995, rev. 1998)
  - Precalculus (1996)
- Differential equations (1998)
- Geometry (1996, rev. 1999)
- SAT Math (1999)
- Statistics (1994, rev. 1998)
- Trigonometry (1997)

=== Social sciences ===
- American government (1999)
- Psychology (1997)
- Sociology (1997)
- World geography (2002) (Note: Comprises three Standard Deviants TV episodes of original material, covering North America, Europe (including Russia and Central Asia), and Africa.)

=== Business ===
- Accounting (1995, rev. 1997)
- Business law (1997)
- Economics (1995)
  - Macroeconomics
  - Microeconomics
- Finance (1994, rev. 1997)
- Marketing (1999)

=== World languages ===
- French (1998)
- Italian (2000)
- Spanish (1997)
  - Advanced Spanish (2002)

=== English language ===
- English composition (1997)
- English grammar (1999)
- English punctuation (2000)
- ESL (2003)
- SAT Verbal (1999)

=== Literature ===
- Shakespeare tragedies (2000) (Note: Covers Titus Andronicus, Romeo and Juliet, Hamlet, Othello, Macbeth, and King Lear.)
- Fantasy literature (2001) (Note: Covers Beowulf, Le Morte d'Arthur, and The Lord of the Rings.)

=== Life skills ===
These titles were released as the No-Brainers series:

- Auto Care (1998)
- Buying a Car (1998)
- Cooking (1998)
- Dating (1998)
- Entertaining at Home (1999)
- Interviewing (1998) (Note: Later repackaged as part of a Standard Deviants title, Get That Job.)
- Personal Finance (1998) (Note: Later repackaged as a Standard Deviants title.)
- Public Speaking (1998)
- Résumés and Cover Letters (1998)
- Taxes (1999)
- Wine (1998)
