= Kerry Washington =

American actress (born 1977)

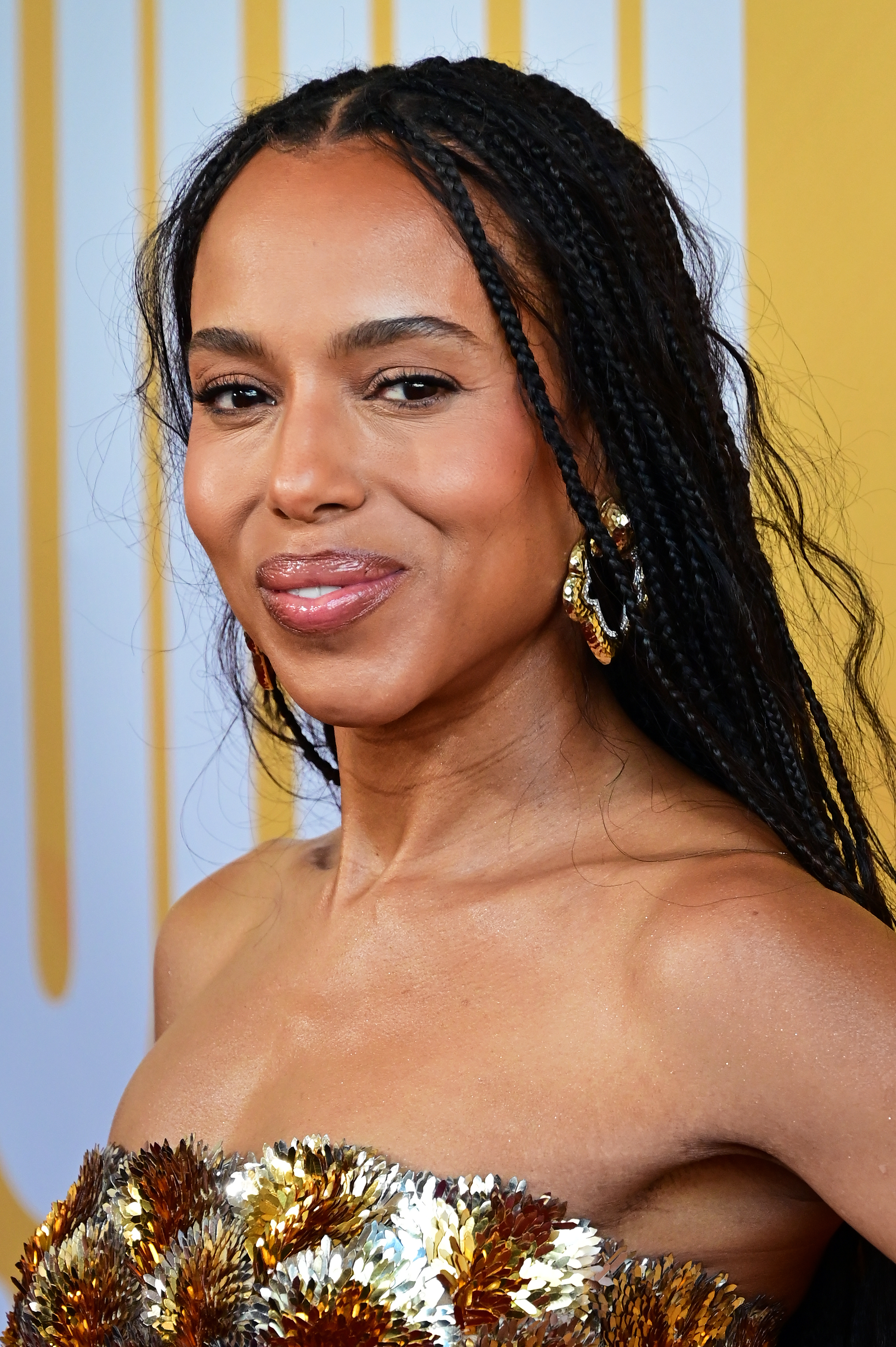
- Washington in 2026
- Born: Kerry Marisa Washington; January 31, 1977 (age 49); New York City, U.S.
- Education: George Washington University
- Occupation: Actress
- Years active: 1994–present
- Spouse: Nnamdi Asomugha (m. 2013)
- Children: 2
- Awards: Full list

Kerry Marisa Washington (born January 31, 1977) is an American actress. She has received several accolades, including a Primetime Emmy Award as well as nominations for two Golden Globe Awards and two Tony Awards. She was included in Time's 100 list of most influential people in 2014, and Forbes named her the eighth-highest-paid television actress in 2018.

Washington gained wide recognition for starring as crisis management expert Olivia Pope in the ABC drama series Scandal (2012–2018). For her role, she was twice nominated for the Primetime Emmy Award for Outstanding Lead Actress in a Drama Series and once for the Golden Globe Award for Best Actress – Television Series Drama. She was further Emmy-nominated for her roles as Anita Hill in the HBO political film Confirmation (2016), and a troubled mother in the Hulu miniseries Little Fires Everywhere (2020).

Washington made her feature film debut acting in the drama Our Song (2000). She played Alicia Masters in the live-action Fantastic Four films of 2005 and 2007, and has taken roles in diverse films such as Ray (2004), Mr. & Mrs. Smith (2005), The Last King of Scotland (2006), I Think I Love My Wife (2007), Mother and Child (2009), For Colored Girls (2010), and Django Unchained (2012). In 2024, she portrayed Major Charity Adams in the war film The Six Triple Eight.

On stage, she made her Broadway debut in David Mamet's play Race (2009). She returned to the Broadway stage starring in the Christopher Demos-Brown play American Son and reprised her role in the 2019 television adaptation on Netflix.

== Early life and education ==
Washington was born on January 31, 1977, in The Bronx, New York City. Her mother Valerie, is a professor and educational consultant, and her father, Earl Washington, is a real estate broker. However, she wrote in her 2023 memoir that she found out that Earl Washington was not her biological father. Washington's family is of African-American origin, having moved from South Carolina to Brooklyn. Her mother's family is from Manhattan, and Washington has said that her mother is from a "mixed-race background and from Jamaica, so she is partly English and Scottish and Native American, but also descended from enslaved Africans in the Caribbean." Through her mother, she is a cousin of former U.S. Secretary of State Colin Powell. She was conceived via a sperm donor, which she only learned in 2018.

Washington performed with the TADA! Youth Theater teen group and attended the Spence School in Manhattan from her pre-teen years until graduating from high school in 1994. At the age of 13, she was taken to watch Nelson Mandela speak at Yankee Stadium upon his release from prison. She attended George Washington University, graduating Phi Beta Kappa in 1998 with a double major in anthropology and sociology. She also studied at Michael Howard Studios in New York City.

In April 2016, Washington confirmed that, in the 1990s in New York, she learned to dance from Jennifer Lopez. During her appearance on The Tonight Show Starring Jimmy Fallon, she told host Jimmy Fallon: "I've been taking dance for a long time, since I was a little girl. I had this very inspiring teacher named Larry Maldonado, for anybody from my neighborhood in the Bronx, he was our role model. And he had an awesome substitute teacher named Jennifer, who would sometimes step in and teach. But, then she left to move to L.A. and be on In Living Color. I learned to dance from JLo!"

In 2023, Washington revealed that she had an abortion when she was in her late 20s.

== Career ==
=== 1994–2009: Beginnings and breakthrough ===
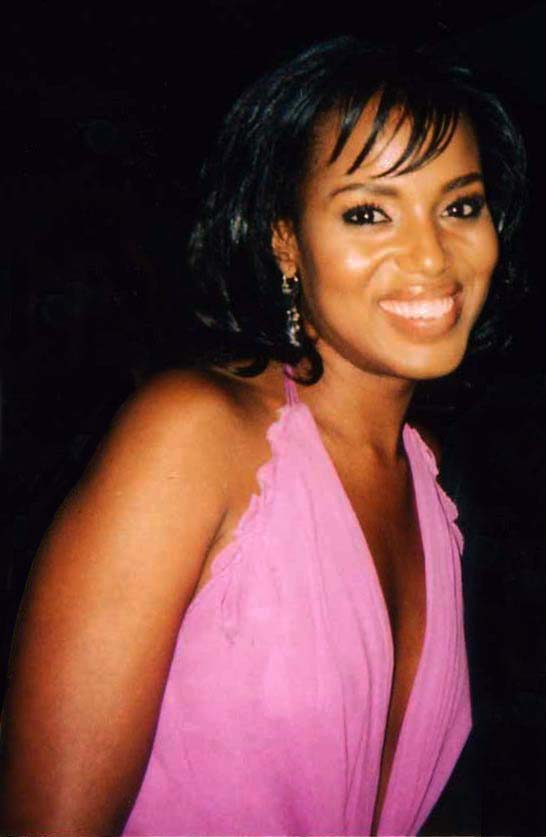
Washington at the New York premiere of She Hate Me in 2004

Washington got her Screen Actors Guild (SAG) card as a requirement for a commercial that she starred in. Washington made her screen debut in the ABC telefilm Magical Make-Over (1994). She was in the cast of the 1996 PBS sketch comedy-style educational series Standard Deviants, and she appeared in the short "3D" and the feature film Our Song in 2000. She went on to appear in several movies, including Save the Last Dance (2001) and The Human Stain (2003). In 2002 she played Chris Rock's love interest in the spy thriller Bad Company, a film that represented a turning point for her, in that it was the first time in her career that she had made enough money annually to qualify for health insurance under SAG.

In 2004, she played the female lead in Spike Lee's She Hate Me, and she received strong reviews for her performance. After 2004, she held parts in Mr. & Mrs. Smith (2005), Little Man (2006), I Think I Love My Wife (2007), and as a wife of 1970s Ugandan dictator Idi Amin in the UK historical drama The Last King of Scotland (2006). Washington has also appeared in the recurring role of Chelina Hall on the ABC television series Boston Legal, and in several episodes of the A&E cable-TV series 100 Centre Street. In 2007, she co-directed and appeared in the music video for hip-hop artist Common's song, "I Want You", the fourth single from his album Finding Forever and became a spokesperson for L'Oréal, appearing in commercials and ads alongside fellow actresses, Scarlett Johansson and Eva Longoria, Gong Li, Michelle Yeoh, Dian Sastrowardoyo, Aishwarya Rai, Maya Karin and model Doutzen Kroes.

Washington narrated the critically acclaimed documentary about the New Orleans–based teenage TBC Brass Band, From the Mouthpiece on Back. She also appears in Maxwell's "Bad Habits" video. In 2009, Washington performed in The People Speak, a documentary feature film that uses dramatic and musical performances of the letters, diaries, and speeches of everyday Americans, based on historian Howard Zinn's A People's History of the United States.

=== 2010–2018: Breakthrough and lead in Scandal ===
In 2010, Washington made her Broadway debut in the original production of David Mamet's play Race, alongside James Spader (with whom she worked on Boston Legal), David Alan Grier, and Richard Thomas. She also appeared as a part of the ensemble in Tyler Perry's 2010 drama film For Colored Girls.

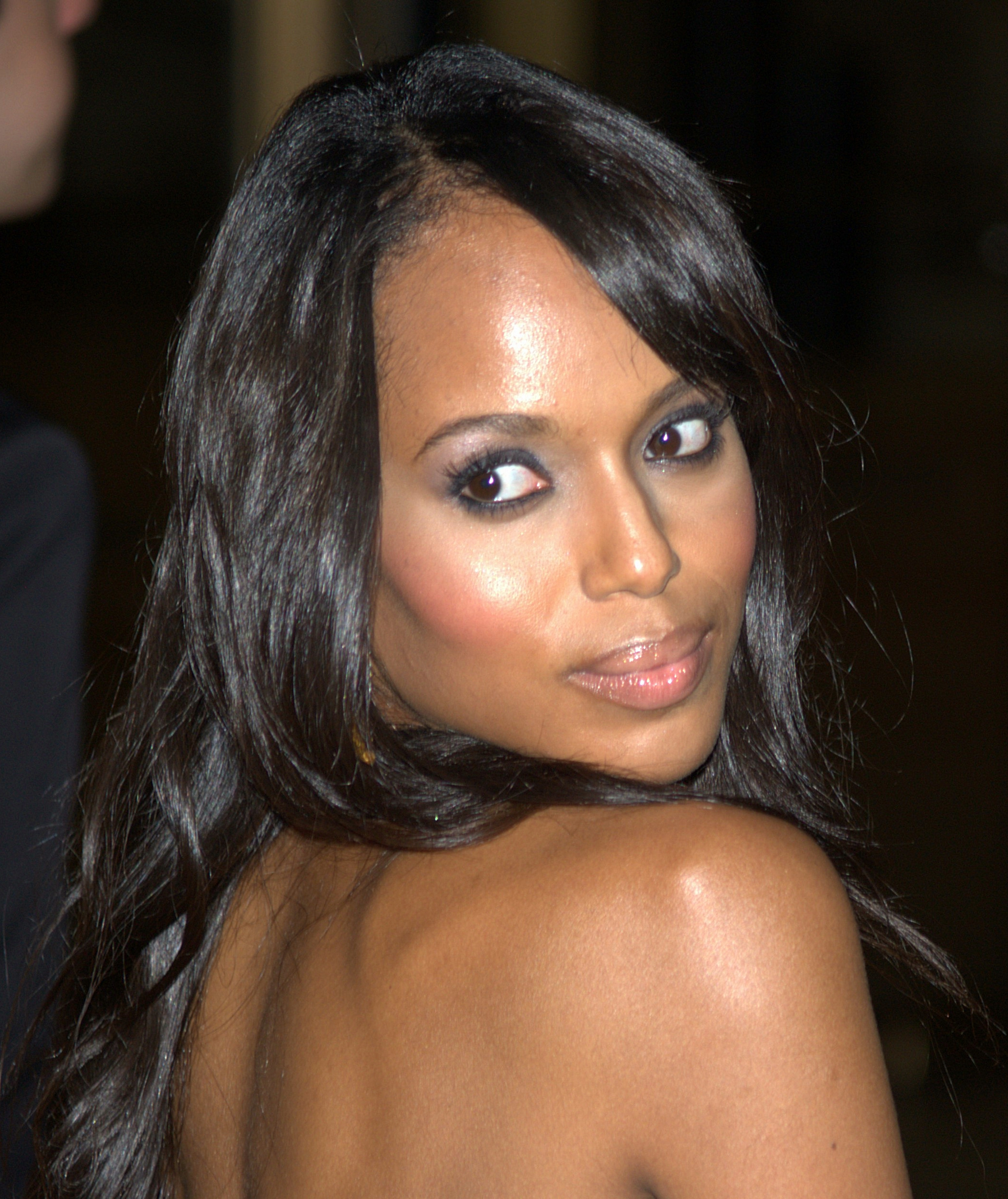
Washington in 2010

She starred in Quentin Tarantino's film Django Unchained (2012), which received widespread critical acclaim. She was invited to join the Academy of Motion Picture Arts and Sciences in June 2012 along with 175 other individuals.

From April 2012 to April 2018, Washington starred in the ABC drama series Scandal, created by Shonda Rhimes, as Olivia Pope, a crisis manager who runs her own crisis management firm called Olivia Pope & Associates in Washington, D.C. In this position, she worked for high-profile figures, most notably the President of the United States, who was also her on-off lover. The show was a commercial and critical success, and was called one of the most talked about drama series on Facebook and Twitter. Washington's performance earned positive reviews, and in 2013, she won the award for Outstanding Actress in a Drama Series at the 44th NAACP Image Awards and was also presented with the NAACP President's Award. The same year, she was named "Favorite actress" and Scandal "Favorite Drama" of the year at TV Guide's Magazine Fan Favorite Awards and was also crowned 2013's "TV Star of the Year" by the editors of the magazine.

For her work in the second season of Scandal, Washington was nominated for an Emmy at the 65th Primetime Emmy Awards and 66th Primetime Emmy Awards, becoming the first African-American woman to be nominated in the category of Outstanding Lead Actress in a Drama Series in 18 years. She was also nominated for a Screen Actors Guild Award for Outstanding Performance by a Female Actor in a Drama Series as well as a Golden Globe Award for Best Actress in a Television Drama Series. The Boston Globe ranked Scandal tenth place of its list of "Top 10 political TV shows" in 2015.

In addition to Washington's acting, her costumes as Olivia Pope attracted positive attention, prompting Vanity Fair to name the character one of "The Top Ten Best-Dressed TV Characters" in 2013. According to the show's costume designer, Lyn Paolo, the success of Olivia Pope's wardrobe was based on "this idea of having [her character] wear such soft, feminine colors in a man's world". In 2014, Washington and Paolo won the Influencer Award at the 2014 Ace Fashion Awards for Olivia Pope's stylish clothes on the show.

In 2013, Washington ranked No. 2 in People magazine's 100 Most Beautiful people and was named Woman of the Year by Glamour magazine. The same year, she ranked No. 20 on Forbes magazine's annual list of the highest-paid actors in television and was announced as the new face of Neutrogena skin care. Washington hosted Saturday Night Live on November 2, 2013, where she impersonated Michelle Obama and Oprah Winfrey in a cold opening sketch that satirized criticism of Saturday Night Live for not having had any black female cast members for many years.

Washington played the lead role in Confirmation, an HBO movie directed by Rick Famuyiwa about Anita Hill's testimony during Clarence Thomas Supreme Court nomination, which aired in 2016. For her role in Confirmation, Washington was nominated for the Primetime Emmy Award for Outstanding Lead Actress in a Limited Series or Movie at the 68th Primetime Emmy Awards, as well as the Critics' Choice Awards' equivalent the same year. Confirmation was also nominated for the Emmy Award for Outstanding Television Movie at the Emmys. That same year, Washington launched Simpson Street, a production company, which has an overall deal with ABC Studios.

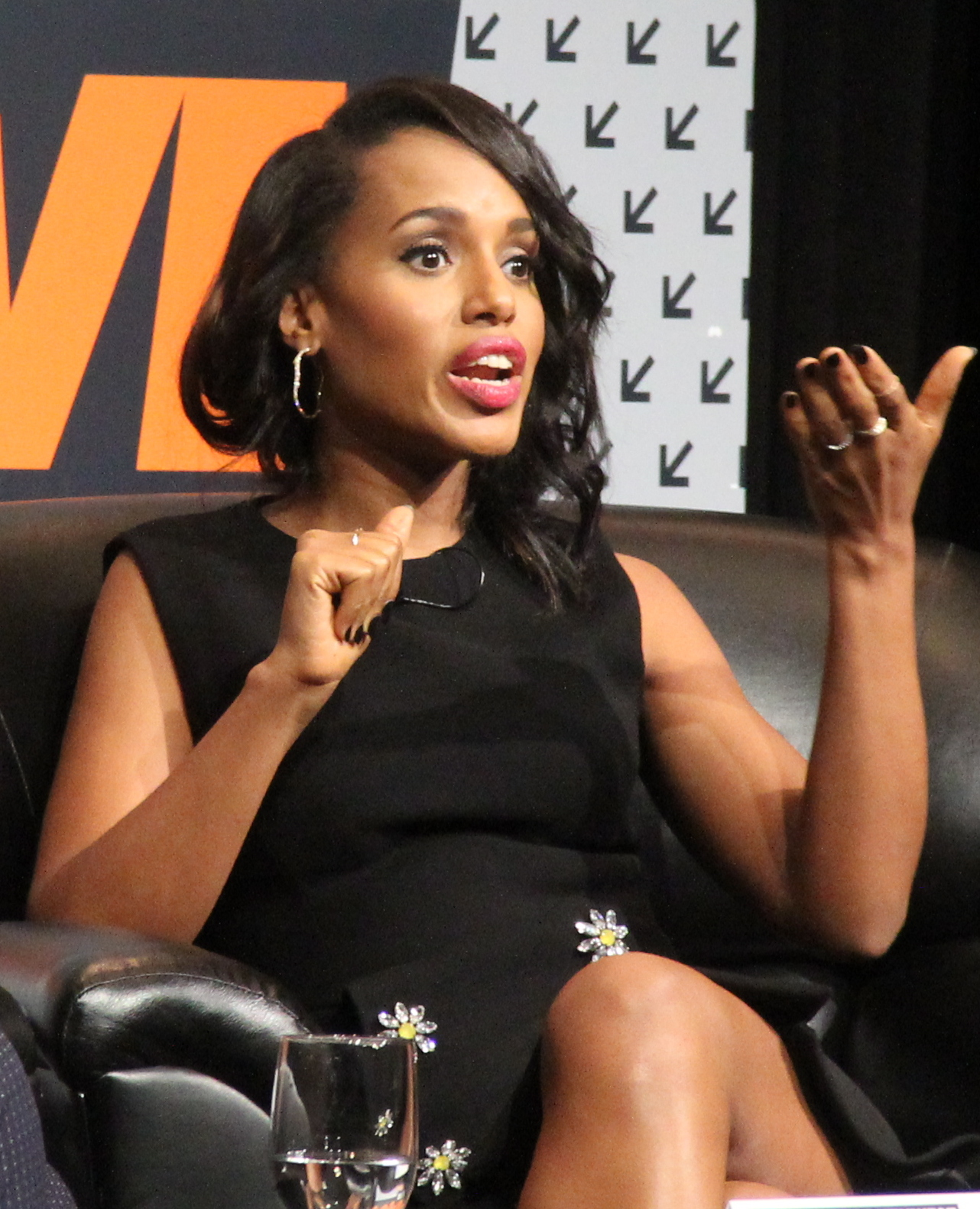
Washington in 2016

In 2017, Washington voiced a role in Cars 3. In 2018, Washington made her directorial debut on Scandal, directing the tenth episode of the seventh season. She also appeared as Olivia Pope in two episodes of How to Get Away with Murder, as part of a crossover with Scandal. Scandal concluded after seven seasons in April 2018. That same year, Washington starred in the Broadway play American Son written by Christopher Demos-Brown, following two parents arriving at a police station in the middle of the night looking for answers.

=== Since 2019 ===
In 2019, Washington directed the seventh episode of the second season of Showtime's SMILF. She then starred in Live in Front of a Studio Audience on ABC in a recreation of The Jeffersons, portraying the role of Helen Willis. The same year, she reprised her role in the film adaptation of the Broadway play American Son, which she also executive produced, for Netflix. The film had its world premiere at the Toronto International Film Festival on September 12, 2019, and was released on November 1, 2019.

In 2020, Washington served as an executive producer on The Fight, a documentary film revolving around legal battles lawyers for the ACLU face during the Trump administration, which had its world premiere at the Sundance Film Festival on January 30, 2020. That same year, she served as an executive producer and starred alongside Reese Witherspoon in the Hulu miniseries Little Fires Everywhere, an adaptation of Celeste Ng's 2017 novel of the same name. Washington directed the ninth episode of the fourth season of the HBO comedy series Insecure.

In September 2020, she won the Primetime Emmy Award for Outstanding Variety Special (Live) as a producer of the television special Live in Front of a Studio Audience. In December 2020, Washington starred in The Prom, directed by Ryan Murphy for Netflix, as Mrs. Greene.

From 2022, Washington will star in the recurring role of fourth-grade teacher Rayshelle Peyton in The Simpsons. She plays Professor Clarissa Dovey in the film adaptation of Soman Chainani's The School for Good and Evil.

Washington will next star in the war drama The Six Triple Eight directed by Tyler Perry, and in the action thriller Shadow Force. She will also star alongside an ensemble cast in Rian Johnson's third installment of the Knives Out film series, titled Wake Up Dead Man.

She will serve as ambassador of the 31st American Black Film Festival in 2027.

== Personal life ==
Washington wrote in her memoir that a boy inappropriately touched her when she was a child. She also wrote in her memoir that, "By the time I got to college, my relationship with food and my body had become a toxic cycle of self-abuse that utilized the tools of starvation, binge eating, body obsession and compulsive exercise", and that she had suicidal thoughts.

Washington was engaged to actor David Moscow from October 2004 to March 2007.

Washington married former NFL player Nnamdi Asomugha on June 24, 2013, in Hailey, Idaho. They have a daughter and a son. She is also a stepmother to Asomugha's daughter from a previous relationship.

On May 19, 2013, she was the commencement speaker for her alma mater, George Washington University. Before giving her commencement address she was presented with an honorary Doctorate of Fine Arts.

=== Activism ===
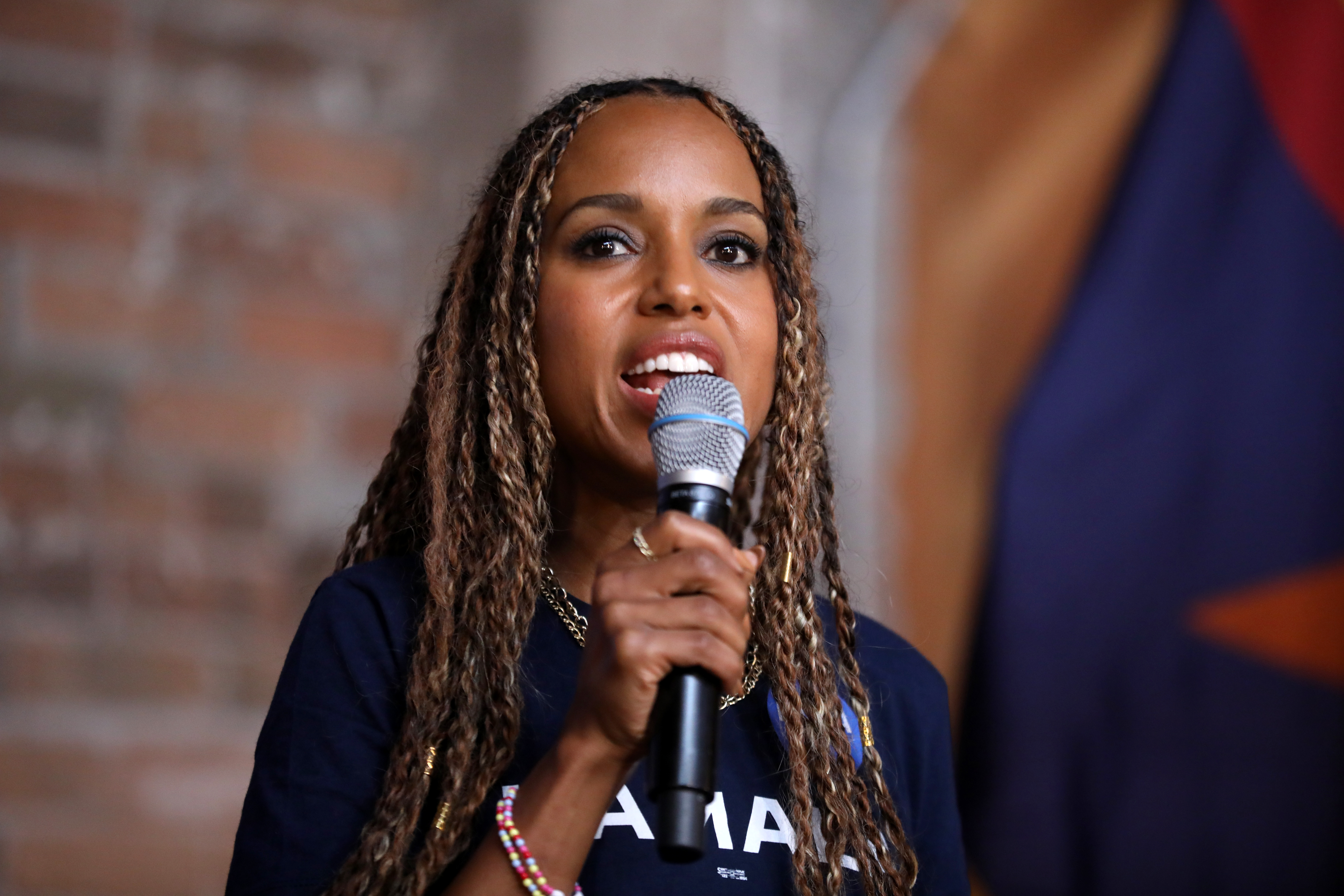
Washington in 2024

In 2007, Washington and other celebrities joined for the 2007 Lee National Denim Day, supporting the Women's Cancer Programs of the Entertainment Industry Foundation. In September 2012, Washington spoke at the Democratic National Convention in favor of re-electing Barack Obama, with her speech focusing on addressing voter apathy. Washington has also used her celebrity status to support voter registration drives.

Washington is also a supporter of LGBT rights. In August 2013, she was named an honorary chairperson of the GLSEN Respect Awards; and she received the GLAAD Vanguard Award on March 21, 2015. In June 2016, the Human Rights Campaign released a video in tribute to the victims of the Orlando nightclub shooting; in the video, Washington and others told the stories of the people killed there.

She is a member of the Creative Coalition; which is a board of actors, writers, musicians, and producers that explore issues that are at the forefront of national discourse. She is also a member of V-Day, a global movement that brings awareness to violence against women and girls. In March 2016, Washington and fellow ShondaLand colleagues, Ellen Pompeo, Viola Davis and Shonda Rhimes, appeared in a commercial endorsing Hillary Clinton for president.

Washington emceed the third night of the 2020 Democratic National Convention. For the 2022 Georgia gubernatorial election, Washington endorsed Democratic candidate Stacey Abrams.

== Filmography ==
=== Film ===
Year	Title	Role	Notes	Ref.
2000	Our Song	Lanisha Brown		
2000	3D	Angie	Short film	
2001	Save the Last Dance	Chenille Reynolds		
2001	Lift	Denise "Niecy" Maxwell		
2002	Take the A Train	Keisha	Short film	
2002	Bad Company	Julie Benson		
2003	The United States of Leland	Ayesha		
2003	The Human Stain	Ellie		
2003	Sin	Kassie Burns		
2004	Against the Ropes	Renee		
2004	She Hate Me	Fatima Goodrich		
2004	Ray	Della Bea Robinson		
2005	Sexual Life	Rosalie		
2005	Mr. & Mrs. Smith	Jasmine		
2005	Fantastic Four	Alicia Masters		
2005	Wait	Maggie	Short film	
2006	Little Man	Vanessa Edwards		
2006	The Last King of Scotland	Kay Amin		
2006	The Dead Girl	Rosetta		
2007	I Think I Love My Wife	Nikki Tru		
2007	Put It in a Book	Sheila	Short film	
2007	30,000 Leagues Under the Sea	Medical Officer Marissa Brau		
2007	Fantastic Four: Rise of the Silver Surfer	Alicia Masters		
2008	Woman in Burka	Kerry	Short film	
2008	Miracle at St. Anna	Zana Wilder		
2008	Lakeview Terrace	Lisa Mattson		
2009	Life Is Hot in Cracktown	Marybeth • Mickey		
2009	Mother and Child	Lucy		
2010	Night Catches Us	Patricia Wilson		
2010	For Colored Girls	Kelly Watkins		
2011	The Details	Rebecca Mazzoni		
2012	A Thousand Words	Caroline McCall		
2012	Django Unchained	Broomhilda "Hildi" von Schaft		
2013	Peeples	Grace Peeples		
2017	Cars 3	Natalie Certain	Voice role	
2019	American Son	Kendra Ellis-Connor	Also executive producer	
2020	The Fight	Producer	Documentary film	
2020	The Prom	Ms. Greene		
2022	The School for Good and Evil	Professor Clarissa Dovey		
2024	The Six Triple Eight	Major Charity Adams	Also executive producer	
2025	Shadow Force	Kyrah Owens • "Ombra"	Also executive producer	
2025	Wake Up Dead Man	Vera Draven		
2026	Animals	Abigail Kimball		
2027	An Innocent Girl		Filming	

=== Television ===
Year	Title	Role	Notes	Ref.
1994	ABC Afterschool Special	Heather	Episode: "Magical Make-Over"	
1996	Standard Deviants	Kerry	PBS educational series	
2001	NYPD Blue	Maya Young	Episode: "Franco, My Dear, I Don't Give a Damn"	
2001	Deadline	Tina Johnson	Episode: "The Undesirables"	
2001	Law & Order	Allie Lawrence	Episode: "3 Dawg Night"	
2001	100 Centre Street	Trina	Recurring role; 5 episodes (seasons 1–2)	
2002	The Guardian	Drea Westbrook	Episode: "The Next Life"	
2004	Wonderfalls	Mahandra McGinty	Unaired television pilot	
2004	Strip Search	Mae	Television film	
2005–2006	Boston Legal	Chelina Hall	Recurring role; 5 episodes (seasons 1–2)	
2008	Psych	Mira Gaffney	Episode: "There's Something About Mira"	
2009–2013	Project Runway	Herself	Guest judge; 3 episodes	
2010	Black Panther	Princess Shuri	Voice role; 5 episodes	
2012–2018	Scandal	Olivia Pope	Main role; 124 episodes (also producer)	
2013	Jimmy Kimmel Live!	Keisha	Episode: "After the Oscars"	
2013	Saturday Night Live	Herself (host)	Episode: "Kerry Washington/Eminem"	
2015	Saturday Night Live 40th Anniversary Special	Dr. Julianne Richards	Television special	
2016	Confirmation	Anita Hill	Television film; also executive producer	
2018	How to Get Away with Murder	Olivia Pope	Episodes: "Ask Him About Stella" and "Lahey v. Commonwealth of Pennsylvania"	
2019	Live in Front of a Studio Audience	Helen Willis	Episode: "Norman Lear's All in the Family and The Jeffersons"; Also executive producer for "All in the Family and Good Times"	
2020	Little Fires Everywhere	Mia Warren	Miniseries; 8 episodes (also executive producer)	
2022–present	The Simpsons	Rayshelle Peyton	Voice role; 7 episodes	
2023–2024	Unprisoned	Paige Alexander	Main role; 16 episodes (also executive producer)	
2026	Imperfect Women	Eleanor	Miniseries; 8 episodes (also executive producer)	

==== As director ====
Year	Title	Notes
2018	Scandal	Episode: "The People v. Olivia Pope"
2019	SMILF	Episode: "Smile More if Lying Fails"
2020	Insecure	Episode: "Lowkey Trying"

=== Theater ===
Year	Title	Author	Director	Role	Venue	Ref.
2009	Race	David Mamet	David Mamet	Susan	Ethel Barrymore Theatre	
2018	American Son	Christopher Demos-Brown	Kenny Leon	Kendra	Booth Theatre	
2023	Gutenberg! The Musical!	Scott Brown & Anthony King	Alex Timbers	Producer	James Earl Jones Theatre	
2026	The Whoopi Monologues	Whoopi Goldberg	Whitney White	Performer	Mitzi E. Newhouse Theatre	

== Awards and nominations ==
Among her many accolades, Washington has received a Primetime Emmy Awards, five NAACP Image Awards, a Teen Choice Award, and nominations for two Golden Globe Awards and four Screen Actors Guild Awards. One of the most successful women on television, she has received recognized by the Academy of Television Arts and Sciences (ATAS) with nine Emmy nominations, these being:

- 65th Primetime Emmy Awards (2013), Outstanding Lead Actress in a Drama Series, nomination, for Scandal
- 66th Primetime Emmy Awards (2014), Outstanding Lead Actress in a Drama Series, nomination, for Scandal
- 68th Primetime Emmy Awards (2016), two nominations
  - Outstanding Television Movie, nomination, for Confirmation
  - Outstanding Lead Actress in a Limited Series or Movie, nomination, for Confirmation
- 72nd Primetime Emmy Awards (2020), four nominations
  - Outstanding Lead Actress in a Limited Series or Movie, nomination, for Little Fires Everywhere
  - Outstanding Limited Series, nomination, for Little Fires Everywhere
  - Outstanding Television Movie, nomination, for American Son
  - Outstanding Variety Special (Live), win, for Live in Front of a Studio Audience: "All in the Family" and "Good Times"
- 74th Primetime Emmy Awards (2022), Outstanding Variety Special (Live), nomination, for Live in Front of a Studio Audience: "The Facts of Life" and "Different Strokes"

== Bibliography ==
- Washington, Kerry (2023). Thicker than Water: A Memoir. New York: Little, Brown Spark. ISBN 978-0-316-49739-8. OCLC 1397065861.
