= John Douglas Thompson =

English–American actor (born 1964)

- Born: 1964 (age 61–62); Bath, England
- Education: Le Moyne College (BA); Brown University (MFA)
- Occupation: Actor
- Years active: 2003–present

John Douglas Thompson (born 1964) is an English–American actor. He is a Tony Award nominee and the recipient of two Drama Desk Awards, three Obie Awards, an Outer Critics Circle Award, and a Lucille Lortel Award.

The New York Times critic Ben Brantley described Thompson as "one of the most compelling classical stage actors of his generation".

== Early life and education ==
Thompson was born in Bath, England, to Jamaican parents, and was raised in Montreal, Quebec then Rochester, New York. He graduated from Le Moyne College in Syracuse, New York in 1985, where he studied marketing and business. In the early 1990s, he worked as a traveling computer salesman in New England. After losing his job, Thompson decided to pursue acting and enrolled at the Brown University/Trinity Repertory Company program in Providence, Rhode Island.

== Career ==
Thompson began appearing in a variety of lead and supporting roles across New England, most notably at the American Repertory Theater and Shakespeare and Company, also giving his first performance as Othello at the Trinity Repertory Company prior to attaining critical success in New York.

In 2005, he made his Broadway debut, opposite Denzel Washington, as Flavius in Julius Caesar, and later played Le Bret in the 2007 Broadway production of Cyrano de Bergerac, alongside Jennifer Garner and Kevin Kline.

Thompson had a breakout year in 2009, garnering critical acclaim for playing the titular roles in the Off-Broadway productions of Othello and The Emperor Jones, with The New York Times stating "There may be no better classical actor working in the New York theater right now". He won a Lucille Lortel Award and an Obie Award for his performance in Othello, and received a Drama Desk Award nomination for The Emperor Jones.

He starred opposite Kate Mulgrew as Antony in a regional production of Antony and Cleopatra in Hartford, Connecticut in 2010, and played Joe Mott in a 2012 production of The Iceman Cometh in Chicago with Nathan Lane and Brian Dennehy. Also in 2012, Thompson appeared in The Bourne Legacy in the minor role of Lt. Gen. Paulsen.

Thompson received rave reviews for originating the role of Louis Armstrong and other characters in the 2014 Off-Broadway production of the one-actor play Satchmo at the Waldorf, which he reprised at the Wallis Annenberg Center for the Performing Arts in Beverly Hills. He received a Drama Desk Award and an Outer Critics Circle Award for his solo performance.

In 2014, he played the titular role in the Off-Broadway production of Tamburlaine, Parts I and II, and reprised his performance as Joe Mott in the 2015 New York transfer of the Chicago production of The Iceman Cometh. Thompson won a second Obie Award for his performance in both plays, and was presented with a special Drama Desk Award in the same year for "invigorating theater in New York through his commanding presence, classical expertise, and vocal prowess".

In 2018, Thompson appeared in the role of The Starkeeper in Broadway's Carousel at Imperial Theatre, New York, alongside Joshua Henry, Jessie Mueller, and Renee Fleming.

In addition to his theater work, Thompson has appeared on television in Law & Order, Law & Order: SVU, and Conviction. He also appeared in the short film Midway and the legal drama Michael Clayton. He appears as Dr. Mitchell in the 2020 HBO Max film Let Them All Talk directed by Steven Soderbergh. Since 2022, Thompson has appeared as Arthur Scott in the HBO show The Gilded Age.

In the 2022 film Till, Thompson played Emmett Till's Mississippi uncle Mose Wright; his performance was singled out by Oscar nominee Andrea Riseborough as the one "from the past year you’ve been especially moved by".

Thompson portrayed Claudius in a production of Hamlet at the Delacorte Theatre with Shakespeare in the Park in 2023.

In 2024, he made his Royal Shakespeare Company debut as the titular role in Othello.

Thompson will appear alongside Ṣọpẹ́ Dìrísù and Nicole Beharie in the upcoming Netflix limited series adaptation All the Sinners Bleed, based on the S. A. Cosby novel of the same name.

== Selected stage work ==
Year	Production	Role	Notes
2005	Julius Caesar	Flavius, ensemble	Belasco Theatre, Broadway; Broadway debut.
2007	Cyrano de Bergerac	Le Bret	Richard Rodgers Theatre, Broadway.
2009	Othello	Othello	The Duke on 42nd Street, Off-Broadway.
2009	The Emperor Jones	Brutus Jones	Irish Repertory Theatre, Off-Broadway.
2010	Antony and Cleopatra	Mark Antony	Hartford Stage, Connecticut.
2012	The Iceman Cometh	Joe Mott	Goodman Theatre, Chicago.
2013	A Time to Kill	Carl Lee Hailey	John Golden Theatre, Broadway
2014	Satchmo at the Waldorf	Louis Armstrong, Joe Glaser, Miles Davis	Westside Theatre, Off-Broadway; Also played minor role of Miles Davis.
2014	Tamburlaine, Parts I and II	Tamburlaine	Theatre for a New Audience, Off-Broadway.
2015	The Iceman Cometh	Joe Mott	Brooklyn Academy of Music, New York; Transfer of 2012 Chicago production.
2016	Satchmo at the Waldorf	Louis Armstrong, Joe Glaser, Miles Davis	American Conservatory Theater, San Francisco.
2016	A Doll's House/The Father	Torvald/The Captain	Theatre for a New Audience, Off-Broadway; Played in repertory.
2017	Jitney	Jim Becker	Samuel J. Friedman Theatre, Broadway.
2017	Julius Caesar	Cassius	Delacorte Theater, New York; Shakespeare in the Park.
2017	Hamlet	Hamlet	American Conservatory Theater, San Francisco.
2018	Carousel	The Starkeeper	Imperial Theatre, Broadway.
2019	King Lear	Earl of Kent	Cort Theatre, Broadway.
2022	The Merchant of Venice	Shylock	Theatre for a New Audience, Off-Broadway.
2023	Endgame	Hamm	Irish Repertory Theatre, Off-Broadway.
2023	Hamlet	Claudius	Delacorte Theater, New York; Shakespeare in the Park.
2023	Inherit the Wind	Matthew Harrison Brady	Pasadena Playhouse, Pasadena.
2024	Othello	Othello	Royal Shakespeare Company, Stratford-upon-Avon.

== Filmography ==
=== Film ===
Year	Title	Role	Notes
2007	Midway	Red	Short
2007	Michael Clayton	Jail Guard	
2012	The Bourne Legacy	Lt. Gen. Paulsen	
2014	Glass Chin	Lou Gibson	
2014	Day Ten		Short
2014	A Most Violent Year	Male Radio Reporter	Voice role
2016	Wolves	Socrates	
2017	The Immortal Life of Henrietta Lacks	Lawrence Lacks	TV movie
2019	21 Bridges	Reverend	
2020	The Letter Room	Jackson	Short
2020	Let Them All Talk	Dr. Mitchell	
2022	The 355	Larry Marks	
2022	Till	Mose Wright	
2025	Highest 2 Lowest	Detective Earl Briggs	

=== Television ===
Year	Title	Role	Notes
2002–2007	Law & Order: Special Victims Unit	Various roles	2 episodes
2003	Law & Order	Lloyd Jackson	2 episodes
2006	Conviction	John Jenkins	1 episode
2008	Great Performances	Le Bret	Televised version of the 2007 Broadway production of Cyrano de Bergerac
2010	Gravity	Mack	1 episode
2014	Madam Secretary	Four Star General	1 episode
2016	Person of Interest	Murphy	1 episode
2016	Bull	Greg Perkins	1 episode
2020–2021	For Life	Spencer Richardson	8 episodes
2021	Mare of Easttown	Chief Carter	Main role
2022–present	The Gilded Age	Arthur Scott	Main role (seasons 2–present); recurring (season 1)
2024	Great Performances	Claudius	Televised version of the 2023 Shakespeare in the Park production of Hamlet
2026	The Punisher: One Last Kill	Old vet	Disney+ television special
TBA	All the Sinners Bleed †	Albert Crown	Limited series

== Awards and nominations ==
Year	Award	Category	Work	Result
2009	Drama League Award	Distinguished Performance	Othello	Nominated
2009	Lucille Lortel Award	Outstanding Lead Actor	Othello	Won
2009	Obie Award	Performance	Othello	Won
2010	Drama Desk Award	Outstanding Actor in a Play	The Emperor Jones	Nominated
2010	Drama League Award	Distinguished Performance	The Emperor Jones	Nominated
2010	Lucille Lortel Award	Outstanding Lead Actor	The Emperor Jones	Nominated
2014	Drama Desk Award	Outstanding Solo Performance	Satchmo at the Waldorf	Won
2014	Drama League Award	Distinguished Performance	Satchmo at the Waldorf	Nominated
2014	Outer Critics Circle Award	Outstanding Solo Performance	Satchmo at the Waldorf	Won
2014	Lucille Lortel Award	Outstanding Solo Show	Satchmo at the Waldorf	Nominated
2015	Drama Desk Award	Special Award		Honouree
2015	Drama League Award	Distinguished Performance	The Iceman Cometh and Tamburlaine, Parts I and II	Nominated
2015	Obie Award	Performance	The Iceman Cometh and Tamburlaine, Parts I and II	Won
2017	Tony Award	Best Featured Actor in a Play	Jitney	Nominated
2017	Drama Desk Award	Outstanding Featured Actor in a Play	Jitney	Nominated
2017	New York Drama Critics' Circle	Special Citation	Jitney	Honouree
2017	Drama League Award	Distinguished Performance	A Doll's House/The Father and Jitney	Nominated
2018	Drama League Award	Distinguished Performance	Julius Caesar	Nominated
2022	Drama Desk Award	Outstanding Actor in a Play	The Merchant of Venice	Nominated
2023	Obie Award	Sustained Achievement in Performance	Endgame and Hamlet	Won
2023	Drama Desk Award	Outstanding Lead Performance in a Play	Endgame	Nominated
2023	Drama League Award	Distinguished Performance	Endgame	Nominated
2023	Lucille Lortel Award	Outstanding Lead Performer in a Play	Endgame	Nominated
2023	Screen Actors Guild Awards	Outstanding Performance by an Ensemble in a Drama Series	The Gilded Age	Nominated
