= Biddi-luxe! =

Studio album by The Lascivious Biddies
- Released: 2002
- Recorded: 2002
- Genre: Jazz/Cabaret

The Lascivious Biddies chronology
Biddi-luxe! (2002)	Get Lucky (2004)

Biddi-luxe! is the debut album of The Lascivious Biddies.

== Track listing ==
1. "Rhode Island (a.k.a. Coney Island)"
2. "It's Only a Paper Moon"
3. "Little D's Daydream"
4. "Ethel and Esther"
5. "I'd Rather"
6. "Alice"
7. "Headed South"
8. "Prairie Song"
9. "Idle Boy"
10. "Ladies Home Auxiliary"
11. "Moon River"
12. "Head Over Heels"
13. "The Anthem"
