= Christopher Demos-Brown =

American lawyer and playwright

Christopher Demos-Brown is a Miami trial lawyer, and playwright with over a dozen full-length plays and screenplays to his credit. Several of his plays have earned multiple regional theater awards over the years but it wasn't until November 4, 2018 that American Son debuted as his first Broadway play, opening at the historic Booth Theatre. The play was directed by Kenny Leon, and starred Kerry Washington, Steven Pasquale, Jeremy Jordan and Eugene Lee. His film adaptation of the play, also titled American Son, premiered on Netflix in November 2019 as a television drama, and was nominated for a 2020 Primetime Emmy Award for Outstanding Television Movie.

== Education and career ==
Chris was born in Philadelphia, but by the time he was in the fourth grade had moved to Miami with his family. He attended Dartmouth College in the mid-1980s, majoring in Russian with a minor in history, with a potential goal of joining the United States Foreign Service. In 1992, he graduated from the Fletcher School of Law and Diplomacy, and the University of Geneva.

His interest in the performing arts became serious while he was attending Dartmouth. He acted in several stage productions and directed some short plays. Prior to attending law school, Chris spent two years in Los Angeles pursuing an acting career. When asked about acting during a 2018 interview with Broadway Buzz, he said, “I wanted to be an actor in the worst way, and I was an actor in the worst way, unfortunately.” He focused his efforts on being a playwright instead.

== Personal life ==
After law school, Christopher Brown and Stephanie Demos were in training to be prosecutors when they met at the state attorney's office in Miami-Dade. After they married, Chris chose to keep both last names hyphenated as Demos-Brown. They work together as trial lawyers in Miami. In 2010, they and their close friends, (playwright/actor) McKeever] and (director/playwright/actor) Stuart Meltzer, co-founded Zoetic Stage, a professional theatre company at the Adrienne Arsht Center for the Performing Arts. Stephanie serves as board president, and Chris is the company's literary manager.

== Honors and awards ==
Year	Production	Honors/Awards	Ref
2009	When The Sun Shone Brighter	Carbonell Award for Best New Work in (2011); Silver Palm Award for Best New Work in (2011)	
2011	Captiva	Silver Palm Award for Best New Work	
2013	American Hero (formerly Fear Up Harsh)	2014 Steinberg Citation from the American Theatre Crtitics Association Carbonell Award for Best New Work	
2015	Stripped	Silver Palm Award for Outstanding New Work Top Ten Plays of 2015 (Miami New Times)	
2016	American Son	Laurents/Hatcher Award (2016) Won 5 Berkshire Theatre Awards including Best Production and Best New Play (2016)	
2018	Wrongful Death & Other Circus Acts	Best South Florida Play of 2018 - Boca Magazine (John Thomason) Carbonell Award for Best New Work (2019) Silver Palm Award for Best New Work (2019)	
2020	American Son (film adaptation, TV drama)	2020 Primetime Award Nomination for Outstanding Television Movie	
