= Chalk Two Down =

- Homeland episode
- Episode no.: Season 8 Episode 5
- Directed by: Alex Graves
- Written by: Chip Johannessen; Patrick Harbinson
- Production code: 8WAH05
- Original air date: March 8, 2020
- Running time: 48 minutes

Guest appearances
- Mohammad Bakri as Abdul Qadir G'ulom; Sam Trammell as Vice President Ben Hayes; Tim Guinee as Scott Ryan; Andrea Deck as Jenna Bragg; Cliff Chamberlain as Mike Dunne; Charles Brice as Staff Sergeant John Durkin; Sam Chance as Specialist Drew Soto; Octavio Rodriguez as Specialist Arturo Gonzales; Victor Almanzar as Staff Sergeant Justin Wenzel; Terry Serpico as General Owens; Seear Kohi as Balach; Eugene Lee as General Mears; Christopher Maleki as President Daoud; Tracy Shayne as Ambassador Gaeto; Derrick Williams as Major Landau; Emilio Cuesta as Specialist Charlie Stoudt; Esteban Benito as Airman Barajas; Mustafa Haidari as Firooz; Michael Rabe as Chief Mechanic Worley

Episode chronology
← Previous "Chalk One Up"	Next → "Two Minutes"
- Homeland season 8

"Chalk Two Down" is the fifth episode of the eighth season of the American television drama series Homeland, and the 89th episode overall. It premiered on Showtime on March 8, 2020.

== Plot ==
The troops from Combat Outpost Steedley are the first to arrive at the helicopter crash sites. They confirm that everyone on board, including President Warner and President Daoud, were killed. A Taliban squadron storms the scene and a gunfight ensues. The American troops are outnumbered and struggle to hold their position.

While reviewing the flight manifests, Carrie (Claire Danes) learns that President Warner's helicopter was switched to a different one at the last minute, though it is unclear if it was merely a routine swap due to mechanical issues with the helicopter, as Chief Mechanic Worley (Michael Rabe) claims. Carrie speculates that the crash may have simply been an accident rather than foul play.

Having inherited the presidency, G'ulom (Mohammad Bakri) declines to coordinate with Ambassador Gaeto (Tracy Shayne) on a joint statement. In his speech, he blames Haqqani (Numan Acar) for killing the presidents, and declares martial law in Afghanistan until Haqqani is apprehended. On advice from Saul (Mandy Patinkin), Haqqani tries to flee Kabul, but hits a checkpoint and has to turn back.

With the Taliban about to take control of the crash site, U.S. officials react to the possibility of the Taliban possessing President Warner's body. Following the recommendation of his chief of staff (Linus Roache), acting president Ben Hayes (Sam Trammell) reluctantly gives the order to bomb the site and destroy everything. Carrie contacts Max (Maury Sterling) and urges him to retrieve the black box from the helicopter before it is destroyed. Max does acquire it, but his squad is picked off by Taliban as they retreat. The last survivor, he hides at the other helicopter's crash site but is found by a lone Taliban soldier who holds him at gunpoint.

== Production ==
The episode was directed by Alex Graves and co-written by executive producers Patrick Harbinson and Chip Johannessen.

== Reception ==
=== Reviews ===
Scott Von Doviak of The A.V. Club gave the episode a "B+" grade, and compared it with the previous episode "Chalk One Up": "Just as lean as 'Chalk One Up' but a bit meaner, 'Chalk Two Down' finds two men thrust into power and responding in very different ways. These back-to-back episodes bring Homeland as close to 24 territory as it’s been in a long time, with events occurring in close to real time and characters racing against the clock on all fronts".

Den of Geek's David Crow rated the episode 5 out of 5 stars, and wrote "the white knuckle suspense of these final 10 minutes proves Homeland can still fire on all cylinders".

=== Ratings ===
The original broadcast was watched by 823,000 viewers.
