= Chalk One Up =

- Homeland episode
- Episode no.: Season 8 Episode 4
- Directed by: Seith Mann
- Written by: Chip Johannessen; Patrick Harbinson
- Production code: 8WAH04
- Original air date: March 1, 2020
- Running time: 47 minutes

Guest appearances
- Mohammad Bakri as Abdul Qadir G'ulom; Sam Trammell as Vice President Ben Hayes; Tim Guinee as Scott Ryan; Cliff Chamberlain as Mike Dunne; Charles Brice as Staff Sergeant John Durkin; Octavio Rodriguez as Specialist Arturo Gonzales; Andrea Deck as Jenna Bragg; Sam Chance as Specialist Drew Soto; Victor Almanzar as Staff Sergeant Justin Wenzel; Sitara Attaie as Samira Noori; Omar Farahmand as Bilal Khan; Terry Serpico as General Owens; Eugene Lee as General Mears; Emilio Cuesta as Specialist Charlie Stoudt; Christopher Maleki as President Daoud; Tracy Shayne as Ambassador Gaeto; Beau Bridges as President Ralph Warner

Episode chronology
← Previous "False Friends"	Next → "Chalk Two Down"
- Homeland season 8

"Chalk One Up" is the fourth episode of the eighth season of the American television drama series Homeland, and the 88th episode overall. It premiered on Showtime on March 1, 2020.

== Plot ==
Carrie (Claire Danes) is escorted to Bagram Airfield where she is welcomed by Saul (Mandy Patinkin), and then President Warner (Beau Bridges). Warner thanks Carrie for her sacrifice in Moscow, and informs her that he is taking her advice and visiting a military base in Afghanistan where, along with Afghan President Daoud (Christopher Maleki), he will announce the end of the war. Warner and Daoud depart on helicopter "Chalk Two" accompanied by escort helicopter "Chalk One".

Carrie gets a frantic call from Samira (Sitara Attaie) asking for help—Samira's brother-in-law Bilal (Omar Farahmand) is attempting to kidnap her and force her into marriage. Carrie and her team disable Bilal's car and hold the Taliban men at gunpoint when they try to leave, extricating Samira from the situation.

While returning from the military base, Chalk Two disappears from radar. Chalk One surveys the area and sees the wreckage of a downed helicopter. While looking for a place to land nearby, Chalk One spots Taliban soldiers on the ground. Fire is exchanged briefly before Chalk One is shot down by an RPG blast.

== Production ==
The episode was directed by Seith Mann and co-written by executive producers Patrick Harbinson and Chip Johannessen.

== Reception ==
=== Reviews ===
The episode received an approval rating of 100% on the review aggregator Rotten Tomatoes based on five reviews.

New York Magazine rated the episode 4 out of 5 stars, and called attention to "the way it balances the “macro” of President Warner's journey to announce the ceasefire with the “micro” story of Samira Noori needing to be rescued by Carrie Mathison".

The A.V. Club gave the episode a "B+" grade, while writing "our certainty that something terrible is going to happen to President Warner at some point during his ill-advised jaunt lends a queasy suspense to the proceedings. It’s like watching a slow-motion car wreck".

=== Ratings ===
The original broadcast was watched by 732,000 viewers.
