= Satchmo at the Waldorf =

Play by Terry Teachout

Satchmo at the Waldorf is a one-act, one-person play written by Terry Teachout. It is Teachout's first play and it is about the famous jazz trumpeter and performer Louis Armstrong. According to the printed playbill by Dramatists Play Services Inc.: “this is a work of fiction, freely based on fact.”.

Though the play is written for, and performed by a sole artist, it requires for the actor to double and represent other characters, including Louis Armstrong's manager, Joe Glaser, and trumpeter Miles Davis.

The play has been performed by John Douglas Thompson and Jerome Preston Bates and the performance was originated by Dennis Neal.

== Title ==
The title of the play, Satchmo was one of Louis Armstrong's nicknames, and that it derived from “satchel-mouth”. Waldorf refers to the luxurious hotel in Manhattan called the Waldorf Astoria New York, where Louis Armstrong played and where he also stayed. The whole play takes place at what is supposed to be Louis Armstrong's room.

== Off Broadway ==
The printed programme (2018) indicates that the original off-Broadway production's World Premiere was presented in Lenox, Massachusetts and in New Haven, Connecticut, in the year 2012; the play was previously premiered in Orlando, Florida in 2011. The theatrical work is based on Teachout's biography on Armstrong titled “Pops: A Life of Louis Armstrong” published in 2009.

The play has been produced in other major cities like Chicago, Los Angeles, and Philadelphia, and in Houston, Texas, it was shown from February 24, 2018, through March 18, 2018, at the Alley Theatre.

== Based in realist drama ==
Controversial subjects are covered, or subjects that tend to shock the public, as Henrik Ibsen did in the 20th century, “Satchmo” alludes to matters, and pronounces terms, less preferred by the percolations of higher society's sophistication, and at the same time dives in the ponderation of Louis Armstrong's important relationships; as underlined by Fierro's assessment of Ibsen's realist drama: “he explored universal themes of conflict between the individual and society; between love and duty, and between husband and wife.”.

Showcasing the influence of realist drama, in “Satchmo at the Waldorf” the audience is introduced to the probable material anecdote of Louis Armstrong soiling himself in his later years, and his experience living under Jim Crow laws in his younger years; his response to criticism, the blurred relationship of a business-manager and friend, the difficulty of understanding Glaser's decisions at the time of death, and the artist's love for his fourth wife, Mrs. Lucille Wilson.

Also, the civil rights crisis which occurred during Eisenhower's presidency known as Little Rock Nine and during which Louis Armstrong voiced his criticism on September 17, 1957 is noted in the play.

Teachout's “Satchmo at the Waldorf” depicts Armstrong's humanity at age seventy.

According to Dramatist's Play Services’ website, the play is considered “full-length comedy/drama” and lists the stage as “flexible.”

== Bibliography ==
- Teachout, Terry “Satchmo at the Waldorf” ISBN 978-0-8222-3157-8, ISBN 0822231573 Dramatist's Play Services Inc., New York.
- Fierro, Gloria K. “Literary Realism – Realist Drama: Ibsen” Landmarks in Humanities (2013) p.p. 361-362 McGraw-Hill 3rd Ed.
- Dramatists Play Services Inc., New York. “Satchmo at the Waldorf” Accessed March 18, 2018.
- Playbill, Inc. “Satchmo at the Waldorf” Programme – Alley Theatre (2018).
- Teachout, Terry “Pops: A Life of Louis Armstrong” (2009). ISBN 0547386370, ISBN 978-0547386379 Mariner Books.
- Margolick, David; The New York Times. “The Day Louis Armstrong Made Noise.” September 23, 2007. Louis Armstrong Accessed March 18, 2018.
- Dramatists Play Services Inc., New York. “Satchmo at the Waldorf Preview” Accessed September 22, 2020.
