= American Son (2019 film) =

Drama film

- Directed by: Kenny Leon
- Written by: Christopher Demos-Brown
- Based on: American Son by Christopher Demos-Brown
- Produced by: Kenny Leon; Kristin Bernstein; Christopher Demos-Brown
- Starring: Kerry Washington; Steven Pasquale; Jeremy Jordan; Eugene Lee
- Cinematography: Kramer Morgenthau
- Edited by: Melissa Kent
- Music by: Lisbeth Scott
- Production company: Simpson Street
- Distributed by: Netflix
- Release dates: September 12, 2019 (Toronto Film Festival); November 1, 2019 (Netflix)
- Running time: 90 minutes
- Country: United States
- Language: English

American Son is an American drama film directed by Kenny Leon and written by Christopher Demos-Brown, based on his Broadway play of the same name. The film stars Kerry Washington, Steven Pasquale, Jeremy Jordan and Eugene Lee. It premiered at the Toronto International Film Festival on September 12, 2019, and was released on Netflix on November 1, 2019.

The film received a Primetime Emmy Award nomination for Outstanding Television Movie.

== Plot ==
On a stormy night in a Miami police station, Kendra Ellis-Connor is waiting for a report on the whereabouts of her son Jamal, who has suddenly disappeared. She asks for help from Officer Paul Larkin, a rookie cop who can't tell her anything about the incident. Due to both protocol and a lack of knowledge of the incident, he tells her that he has to wait for Lieutenant John Stokes, the AM shift liaison officer. Her estranged husband, FBI agent Scott Connor, arrives at the station, demanding to know where Jamal is.

Larkin is able to tell Scott that Jamal and two other black men were pulled over by police. The only other thing he can tell him is the fact that Jamal's car had a provocative bumper sticker about violence against cops. This revelation develops into a long argument between Kendra and Scott, where they confront their tumultuous marriage and their experiences raising a biracial son in a privileged community. Kendra repeatedly brings up how Jamal feels depressed and isolated as one of the very few black men at his school (referring to himself as "the face of the race"), while Scott argues that if Jamal wanted to avoid trouble he shouldn't have presented himself as a "gangsta."

Larkin returns and says that Jamal was with two other black men, one of whom has a warrant for misdemeanor drug possession. After this discovery, Kendra and Scott engage in a lengthy, contentious discussion about Jamal growing up in an environment of racial tension, specifically pertaining to Kendra's own experiences as a black woman and her fears of a possible confrontation between Jamal and police. Scott says that Jamal should not have been hanging out with these men in the first place, prompting Kendra to reveal that Jamal was angry at Scott for leaving them, which is why he placed the bumper sticker on his car. Scott then receives a video from his brother, which shows a recording of the traffic stop Jamal was involved in. In it, a police officer fires at a fleeing suspect as a bystander records it.

The video sends Scott over the edge, physically threatening Larkin to know where his son is. At this time, Lieutenant Stokes arrives and places Scott under arrest after Scott shoves him. After booking Scott, Stokes tells Kendra that three black males were taken into custody in connection with the traffic stop, unable to tell if one of them was Jamal. After Scott is released after being given a "promise to appear" court order, Kendra reveals that Jamal left the house after an argument with her.

Stokes is able to obtain a full report of the incident: Bell, Rolle, and Jamal were driving around in Liberty City, where Bell (who was driving the car) stopped to purchase a 'nickel bag' of marijuana. Rodney Banks, a black police officer, witnessed the exchange and stopped the car. After both Bell and Rolle exited the vehicle to confront Banks, Bell fled after Banks had trained his gun on both men. Jamal at that point had exited the vehicle, trying to position himself with hands on the hood of the car. Banks proceeded to fire three shots at Bell. One of the bullets (either a stray shot or ricochet) accidentally hits Jamal in the head, killing him instantly. Kendra and Scott are devastated, and Stokes gives them a moment, and they can only wail in agony. In the final scene, Scott exclaims "I can't breathe! I can't breathe!" either due to his heart murmur or possibly alluding to the killing of Eric Garner.

== Cast ==
- Kerry Washington as Kendra Ellis-Connor
- Steven Pasquale as Scott Connor
- Jeremy Jordan as Officer Paul Larkin
- Eugene Lee as Lieutenant John Stokes

== Reception ==
The film received negative reviews, citing its social commentary on the subject of race as being of a "heavy handed" nature. On review aggregator website Rotten Tomatoes, the film holds an approval rating of 48% based on 25 reviews, and an average rating of 5.5/10. The site's critical consensus reads, "Kerry Washington capably anchors American Son with her nervy turn as a concerned mother, but the staginess of the production ill-serves its heavy-handed social commentary." On Metacritic, the film has a score of 33 out of 100, based on 6 critics, indicating "generally unfavorable" reviews.

=== Awards and nominations ===
| Year | Award | Category | Nominee(s) | Result | Ref |
|---|---|---|---|---|---|
| 2020 | Primetime Emmy Awards | Outstanding Television Movie | Kerry Washington, Pilar Savone, Jeffrey Richards, Rebecca Gold, Kenny Leon and Kristin Bernstein | Nominated | |
