= Lascivious Biddies =

American all-female pop band

The Lascivious Biddies
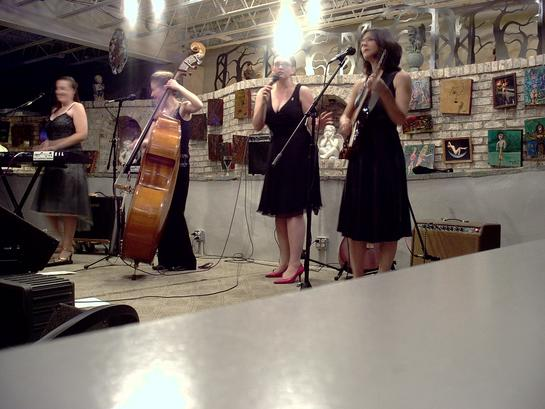
- The Lascivious Biddies

Background information
- Origin: New York City
- Genre: Pop
- Years active: 2001–present
- Members: Deidre Rodman Struck; Lee Ann Westover; Saskia Lane
- Past members: Amanda Monaco; Ila Cantor
- Website: www.biddies.virb.com

The Lascivious Biddies is an all-female pop band that formed in New York City. They first performed in 2001 shortly after September 11. Their first concert was a Halloween show at the Cutting Room in Manhattan, New York, where they dressed as runaway brides.

The band consists of Saskia Lane on vocals, bass, and ukulele; Deidre Rodman Struck on vocals, keyboards, and melodica; and Lee Ann Westover on vocals and ukulele. They have been featured on the Food Network, Discovery Channel, Fuse, NPR, and BBC. The Biddies do charity work through the Musical Connections program of Carnegie Hall by performing at hospitals, shelters, and prisons.

Biddi-luxe!, their debut album, was released in 2002. Founding guitarist Amanda Monaco left the band in late 2007, citing her work on other projects. Guitarist Ila Cantor joined in March, 2008, but left the band as well.

In 2010, the Biddies received a commission from the Weill Music Institute at Carnegie Hall to create a version of the band for families and children. They formed the Itty Biddies and began performing shortly thereafter. It is for this project that the three Biddies began writing music as an ensemble.

== Discography ==
- Biddi-Luxe! (Biddilicious, 2002)
- I Feel Biddy (2002)
- Get Lucky (Eastway, 2004)
- Live in New York City (Eastway, 2006)
- Love You Mean It (Eastway, 2007)
- A Very Biddy Christmas (2008)
