= Eugene Lee (actor) =

American actor

- Born: Eugene Steven Lee; July 16, 1953 (age 73); North Brunswick, New Jersey, U.S.
- Occupations: Actor, playwright
- Years active: 1978–present
- Website: http://www.eugeneleeonline.com

Eugene Lee (born July 16, 1953) is an American actor and playwright. He has appeared in work in Asia and in the United States. He has appeared in guest roles in numerous TV shows such as The White Shadow, Quantum Leap, NYPD Blue and Touched by an Angel.

His stage work includes A Soldier's Play with Denzel Washington and Samuel L. Jackson with the Negro Ensemble Company, a Broadway appearance in August Wilson's Gem of the Ocean, and as a company member for the Kennedy Center's 10-play cycle tribute to Wilson. As a playwright, his works include East Texas Hot Links, Fear Itself, Somebody Called: A Tale of Two Preachers, Killingsworth, and The Rest of Me.

== Filmography ==
=== Film ===
Year	Title	Role	Notes
1995	The O. J. Simpson Story	Willie Mays	TV movie
2003	Black Listed	Derrick Cox	
2019	American Son	Lieutenant John Stokes	

=== Television ===
Year	Title	Role	Notes
1986	Simon & Simon	Shore Patrolman	Episode: "A.W.O.L."
1987	Hooperman		Episode: "Hot Wired"
1988	CBS Summer Playhouse	Renoir LeLuge	Episode: "Dr. Paradise"
1989	The Women of Brewster Place	Basil, Mattie's son	2 episodes
1991	Quantum Leap	Officer Shumway	Episode: "Raped"
1993	Murphy Brown	Man #2	Episode: "Political Correctness"
1995	Martin	Patron	Episode: "C.R.E.A.M."
1996	Silk Stalkings	Lt. Duralde	Episode: "Pre-Judgement Day"
1997	The Good News	Dr. Garner	Episode: "The Dinner Party"
1997	Nothing Sacred	Brendan	Episode: "Calling"
1998	Becker	Mr. Suthoff	Episode: "Tell Me Lies"
1998	Frasier	Officer Athanis	Episode: "The Seal Who Came to Dinner"
2000	Profiler	Sheriff Cunningham	Episode: "Train Man"
2000	Touched by an Angel	Charley	Episode: "Life Before Death"
2000–2004	The District	Hud Sanders	Recurring – 4 episodes
2001	Philly	Norm Swanson	Episode: "Blown Away"
2004	NYPD Blue	Ernest Stallworth	2 episodes
2004	Without a Trace	Tim Hendrix	Episode: "Lost and Found"
2020	Homeland	General Mears	3 epi sod es

== Theater (partial list) ==
Year	Title	Job title	Director	Production company
1980	Home	Lead role		Southern tour
1980	One Monkey Don't Stop No Show	Lead role		Crossroads Theatre, New Brunswick, NJ
1981	A Soldier's Play	Lead – Bernard Cobb (original cast)		(NEC) Lucille Lortel Theatre, NYC
1982	Back to Back	Lead – Verville	Douglas Johnson	WPA Theatre, New York, NY
1982	Manhattan Made Me	Lead role		Negro Ensemble Company (NEC) NY, NY
1982	Sons and Fathers of Sons	Lead role		Negro Ensemble Co. (NEC) NY, NY
1984	Ohio Tip Off	Lead role	James Yoshimura	Center Stage, Baltimore, MD
1985	Eyes of the American	Lead role		(NEC) Theatre Four – Off Broadway
1985	Split Second	Lead role	Hal Scott	Mayfair Theatre, Los Angeles, CA
1990	Jonquil	Lead role		Negro Ensemble Company (NEC) NY, NY
1992	Richard II	Lead – Duke of Gloucester, Lord Ross	Robert Egan	Mark Taper Forum, Los Angeles, CA
2001	The Piano Lesson	Lead role		San Jose Repertory, San Jose, CA
2003	Fences	Lead role	Kenny Leon	True Colors Theatre Co. Atlanta, GA
2004	Gem of the Ocean	Lead role		Walter Kerr Theatre-Broadway
2006	Radio Golf	Lead – Sterling Johnson	Kenny Leon	Taper Theatre, LA, CA
2009	Fences	Lead – Troy Maxson	Kenny Leon	Huntington Theatre, Boston MA
2009	Miss Evers' Boys	Lead role	Kenny Leon	True Colors Theatre Company, Atlanta, GA
2010	Every Tongue Confess	Lead – Elder/Jeremiah	Kenny Leon	Arena Stage, Washington DC
2011	The Book of Grace	Lead – Vet	Suzan Lori-Parks	ZACH Theater, Austin, TX
2012	God of Carnage	Lead – Alan Raleigh	Matt Lenz	ZACH Theater, Austin, TX
2013	Guess Who's Coming to Dinner	John Prentice Sr.	David Esbjornson	Arena Stage, Washington, DC
2017	How I Learned What I Learned	Lead – August Wilson		Round House Theater, Bethesda, MD
2018	American Son	John Stokes	Kenny Leon	Booth Theatre- Broadway
2018	Two Trains Running	Lead – Memphis Lee	Juliette Carrillo	Arena Stage, Washington, DC
2022-23	A Soldier's Play	Lead - Sergeant Vernon C. Waters	Kenny Leon	North American tour
