= Shadow Force (2025 film) =

Film by Joe Carnahan

- Theatrical release poster
- Directed by: Joe Carnahan
- Written by: Leon Chills; Joe Carnahan
- Produced by: Kerry Washington; Pilar Savone; Stephen "Dr." Love; Sterling K. Brown
- Starring: Kerry Washington; Omar Sy; Mark Strong; Da'Vine Joy Randolph; Cliff "Method Man" Smith
- Cinematography: Juan Miguel Azpiroz
- Edited by: Kevin Hale; Mike Sale
- Music by: Craig DeLeon
- Production companies: Made with Love Media; Simpson Street; Indian Meadows Productions
- Distributed by: Lionsgate Films
- Release date: May 9, 2025
- Running time: 104 minutes
- Country: United States
- Language: English
- Budget: $40 million
- Box office: $5.3 million

Shadow Force is a 2025 American action thriller film directed by Joe Carnahan and co-written by Carnahan and Leon Chills. It stars Kerry Washington, Omar Sy, Mark Strong, Da'Vine Joy Randolph, and Cliff "Method Man" Smith.

Shadow Force was released theatrically by Lionsgate on May 9, 2025. It received negative reviews from critics and performed poorly at the box office, grossing only $5 million against a $40 million budget.

== Plot ==
Eight years previously, Kyrah Owens and Issac Sarr were the leaders of a multinational special forces group called Shadow Force, a CIA clandestine operations team performing assassinations in the interest of the United States Government under the direction of Jack Cinder. But Issac and Kyrah fell in love, Kyrah became pregnant with their son Ky, and both abruptly went underground to raise their child in peace. Cinder, who has a volatile temper and does not suffer defeat lightly, has declined to forgive them for their act of "treason" against him, especially since he was obsessively interested in Kyrah himself. Cinder later left the CIA and eventually rose to the rank of Secretary General of G7, but recently his past career has come under close scrutiny by the United States' Inspector General's office.

With Cinder sending elimination teams after them all the time, Kyrah has assumed the role of bait, leading Cinder's assassins away from her family and eliminating them one by one. One day, however, Issac and Ky get accidentally entangled in a bank heist. When one of the robbers threatens his son, Issac attacks and neutralizes them, thereby drawing the public media's attention. When Cinder sees the footage and realizes that the Sarrs have a child, he blacklists them before the assembled G7 representatives and summons the rest of Shadow Force to hunt them down.

Issac retreats with Ky, who is marginally aware of his parents' background history, to a concealed shelter in the Colombian jungle, where Kyrah rejoins them. With Ky's life on the line, Issac and Kyrah decide to take the fight to Cinder before he can eliminate them, and summon Kyrah's relatives and CIA contacts Auntie and Unc for help. As the Sarrs move to another hideout, they barely escape an ambush by Shadow Force, leading them to suspect that either Unc or Auntie must have betrayed them. After getting to Cartagena and separating from her family, Kyrah calls Cinder and demands a personal meeting on Cinder's private island off Cartagena, lest she exposes every one of his secrets to the OIG. While she proceeds to the island, Issac and Ky meet Auntie and Unc in Bogotá.

On the island, Kyrah and Cinder have a tense reunion which escalates into Kyrah trying to shoot him, only to be foiled by a custom made Kevlar vest she failed to notice. Issac, Ky, Auntie and Unc are captured by Shadow Force and brought to the island, where Unc is revealed as Cinder's informant, a fact that Auntie has suspected all along. The tables suddenly turn when Patrick and Parker, Cinder's closest aides, identify themselves as OIG special agents assigned to track Cinder's criminal activities; a gunfight erupts in which Cinder, Patrick and Parker are wounded and the rest of Shadow Force killed. While Auntie and Ky intercept Unc as he tries to run, Kyrah is stunned by an explosive booby trap and taken hostage by Cinder. When Issac arrives, Kyrah silently gives him permission to shoot Cinder through her shoulder, enabling them to overwhelm and kill him.

Six months later, the Sarrs have openly resumed their civilian life. Kyrah gets a call from Auntie, who has decided to found a new, morally better Shadow Force and asks her to join, an offer which Kyrah declines for now. As they celebrate Ky's birthday, Kyrah reveals to Issac that she is pregnant with their second child.

== Cast ==
- Kerry Washington as Kyrah Owens, a former co-leader of Shadow Force under the codename "Ombra"
- Omar Sy as Issac Sarr, a former co-leader of Shadow Force under the codename "Sombra"
- Jahleel Kamara as Ky Sarr, Kyrah and Issac's son
- Mark Strong as Jack Cinder, the former founder and director of Shadow Force and current Secretary General of the G7
- Da'Vine Joy Randolph as "Auntie"/Marvella, Kyrah's older sister and a high-ranking CIA official
- Method Man (credited as Cliff "Method Man" Smith) as "Unc"/Avery, Auntie's husband and Kyrah's brother-in-law
- Marshall Cook as Patrick, Cinder's personal aide and secretly an OIG agent
- Ed Quinn as Parker, one of Cinder's chief operatives and secretly an OIG agent
- Krondon (credited as Marvin Jones III) as Cysgod, a former Shadow Force operative
- Jénel Stevens-Thompson as Anino, a former Shadow Force operative
- Sala Baker as Scath, a former Shadow Force operative
- Natalia Reyes as Moriti, a former Shadow Force operative
- Yoson An as Varjo, a former Shadow Force operative
- Carlos Rei del Castillo as "Aloka", one of Cinder's chief operatives
- Jake Tapper as news anchor (credited as Himself)

== Production ==
On August 16, 2019, Leon Chills' script Shadow Force was acquired by Kerry Washington's production company Simpson Street, Sterling K. Brown's Indian Meadows and Steven "Dr." Love's Made in Love Media, and in September that same year, Lionsgate acquired distribution of the film. while Media Capital Technologies took responsibility for co-financing the film. On October 26, 2020, Victoria Mahoney was hired to direct the movie with Joe Carnahan rewriting the script with Chills. On April 8, 2022, Carnahan replaced Mahoney as director.

Along with the announcement, Washington and Brown were set to play the leads. On April 8, 2022, Omar Sy replaced Brown. In August 2022, Da'Vine Joy Randolph, Method Man, Mark Strong, Jahleel Kamara, Krondon, Natalia Reyes, Yoson An and Ed Quinn were cast in the film. On September 16, 2022, Jénel Stevens-Thompson and Marshall Cook were cast in the film.

On August 30, 2022, principal photography was set to start in Colombia. In October 2022, Washington and Quinn confirmed that filming wrapped.

== Release ==
Shadow Force released in the United States on May 9, 2025. It was delayed from its original release date of May 2, 2025, to take advantage of Mother's Day weekend and avoid competition with Marvel Studios' Thunderbolts*.

== Reception ==
=== Box office ===
The film made $2 million from 2,170 theaters in its opening weekend, finishing sixth at the box office. Following its debut, Deadline Hollywood reported the film would lose the studio around $10 million.

=== Critical response ===
On the review aggregator website Rotten Tomatoes, 31% of 49 critics' reviews are positive, with an average rating of 4.8/10. The website's consensus reads: "Shadow Force is a painfully generic action film weighed down by a lackluster script, predictable twists, and a sentimental undertone that fails to resonate." Metacritic, which uses a weighted average, assigned the film a score of 27 out of 100, based on six critics, indicating "generally unfavorable" reviews. Audiences polled by CinemaScore gave the film an average grade of "B" on an A+ to F scale, while 54% of those surveyed by PostTrak said they would definitely recommend it.

Clint Worthington of RogerEbert.com gave the film one out of four stars and wrote, "Sure, the script sucks and the characters are bad, but I'd almost forgive that if the action was any good. Sadly, Carnahan seems to have lost his touch, with a few glimmers of intense fight choreography obscured by dim lighting or scattershot editing."

Peter Debruge of Variety wrote that the film "aspires to John Wick-ish levels of hyperbolic action without having the elevated fight choreography or visual panache to pull that off. Shot almost entirely in Colombia, the film's locations and P. Erik Carlson's production design are plusses that Juan Miguel Azpiroz's widescreen cinematography doesn't fully exploit, providing neither grittiness nor high style to material that could use one or the other."

=== Accolades ===
Award	Year	Category	Nominated work	Result	Ref.
NAACP Image Awards	2026	Outstanding Actress in a Motion Picture	Kerry Washington	Nominated	
NAACP Image Awards	2026	Outstanding Youth Performance in a Motion Picture	Jahleel Kamara	Nominated	
NAACP Image Awards	2026	Outstanding Stunt Ensemble (TV or Film)	Dartenea Bryant	Nominated	
