= Joe Glaser =

American musical artist manager

Joseph G. Glaser (December 17, 1896 – June 6, 1969) was an artist manager known for his involvement in the careers of jazz musicians, including Louis Armstrong and Billie Holiday.

== Biography ==
Glaser was the son of a Chicago family of Russian Jewish origins. Beginning in the 1910s Glaser owned a number of used car dealerships. One of his employees was Roger Touhy, who went on to become an infamous mob boss. Later Glaser would use his connections with Touhy to come into ownership of a chain of brothels, Glaser bragged that "I was practically a kid and I had the biggest chain of whorehouses on the South Side of Chicago". When asked how he got into show business he would say "on account of the whorehouses".

In the 1920s he became manager of the Sunset Cafe nightclub. The club was a hang-out of Al Capone and his associates, along with being associated with bootlegging. Capone was a silent partner in the Sunset Cafe, and also in the Dreamland Ballroom, which Glaser managed too. In January 1927 Glaser was convicted and fined $100 for operating a "disorderly house", i.e. a brothel. On 25 February of that same year Glaser was arrested for the rape of a 14 year old girl named Delores Wheeler. He was found guilty and sentenced to 10 years imprisonment. However Glaser filed an appeal and in June 1929 the Illinois Supreme Court reversed the original decision. After his first arrest, he was again arrested for sexual assault of a minor, seventeen year old Virginia Hill.

He briefly worked as a Music Corporation of America (MCA) agent in the 1930s. He started managing Louis Armstrong in May 1935. The success of their association caused other jazz musicians to join Glaser and his agency known as the Associated Booking Corporation which "was formed in 1940 by Joe Glaser and Louis Armstrong" with the help of a loan from Jules C. Stein. The relation of Glaser and Armstrong has been represented as a prominent element in Terry Teachout's theater play Satchmo at the Waldorf. Armstrong dedicated his book Selected Writings to Glaser writing "I dedicated this book to my manager and pal, Joe Glaser, the best Friend I've ever had".

In 1962 Glaser reached an agreement with Sidney Korshak whereby he assigned all of the "voting rights, dominion and control" of his majority stock in the company to both Korshak and himself. This meant that when Glaser died in 1969 control transferred to Korshak alone. Glaser designated Korshak as the executor of his probate. It was through Glaser that Korshak and MCA's Jules C. Stein were introduced.

Although his clients had a high opinion of him, Glaser was a feared person in the business industry. Associated Booking Corporation, or "ABC" as it is also known, was incorporated on June 26, 1943, and is still in existence today. It has represented Duke Ellington, Benny Goodman, Lionel Hampton, Woody Herman, Dave Brubeck, Barbra Streisand, B.B. King, The Allman Brothers Band, T. Rex, The Platters and many others.

=== Death ===
Glaser died in June 1969, at Mount Sinai Beth Israel Hospital in New York City after suffering a stroke. He was 72.

=== FBI file ===
After his death in 1969, Glaser's FBI file – CR 166-1672 – was shipped over to the United States House Select Committee on Assassinations sometime between its start in 1976 and its final report in 1979. While the file was sent to the committee in the belief that Glaser had known Jack 'Sparky' Rubenstein (better known as Jack Ruby) from his Chicago days, that file revealed that Glaser was still doing some boxing promotion as late as 1966, representing Ernie Terrell in a proposed 1966 boxing match against the then Cassius Clay. The Muhammad Ali vs. Ernie Terrell fight did not take place until February 6, 1967. Glaser was a mentor to Clarence Avant.
