= Homeland season 8 =

Season of television series

Homeland
- Season 8
- Poster art
- Starring: Claire Danes; Maury Sterling; Costa Ronin; Nimrat Kaur; Numan Acar; Linus Roache; Mandy Patinkin
- No. of episodes: 12

Release
- Original network: Showtime
- Original release: February 9 – April 26, 2020

Season chronology
- ← Previous; Season 7

The eighth and final season of the American spy thriller television drama series Homeland premiered on February 9, 2020, and concluded on April 26, 2020, on Showtime, consisting of 12 episodes.

== Plot ==
Saul Berenson, the National Security Advisor for newly inaugurated President Ralph Warner, is assigned to negotiate peace with the Taliban in Afghanistan. Carrie Mathison is still struggling to recover from her brutal treatment as a prisoner in Russia, but Saul wants to take her to Afghanistan, feeling her knowledge and experience there are essential.

== Cast and characters ==
=== Main ===
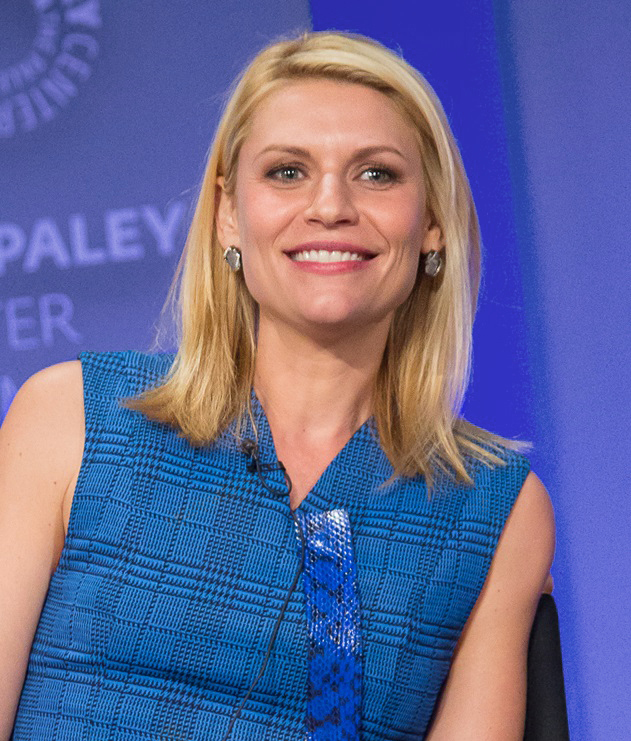
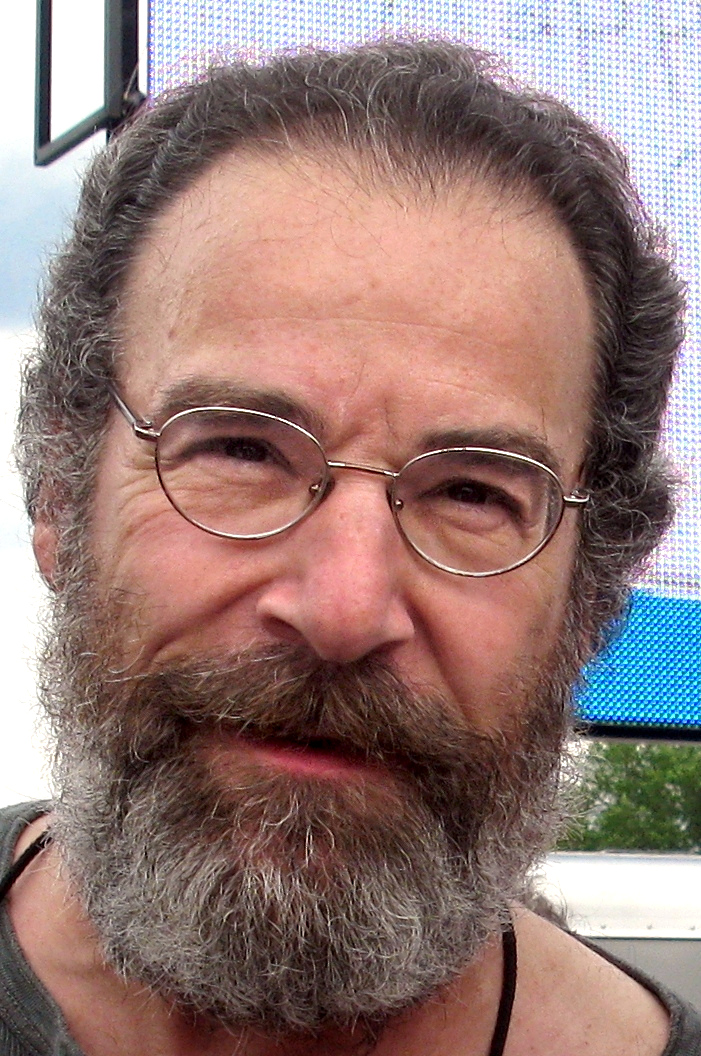
Claire Danes, Mandy Patinkin (left to right) portray lead roles Carrie Mathison and Saul Berenson, respectively.
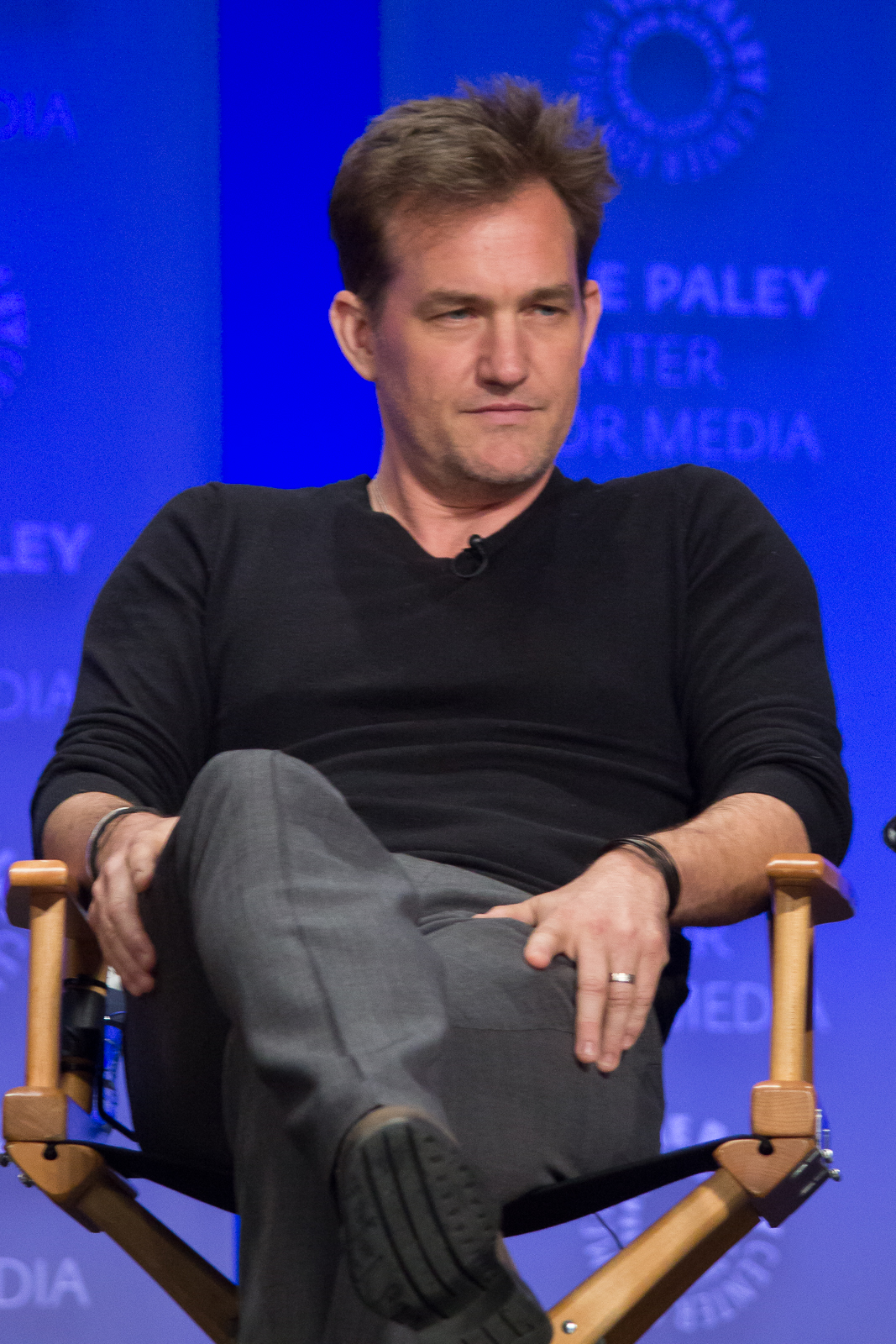
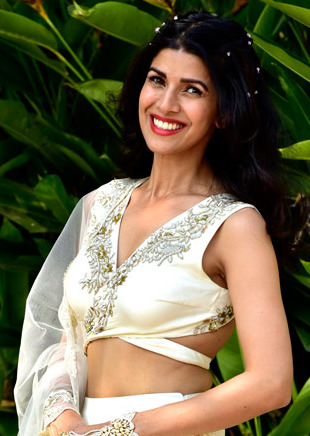
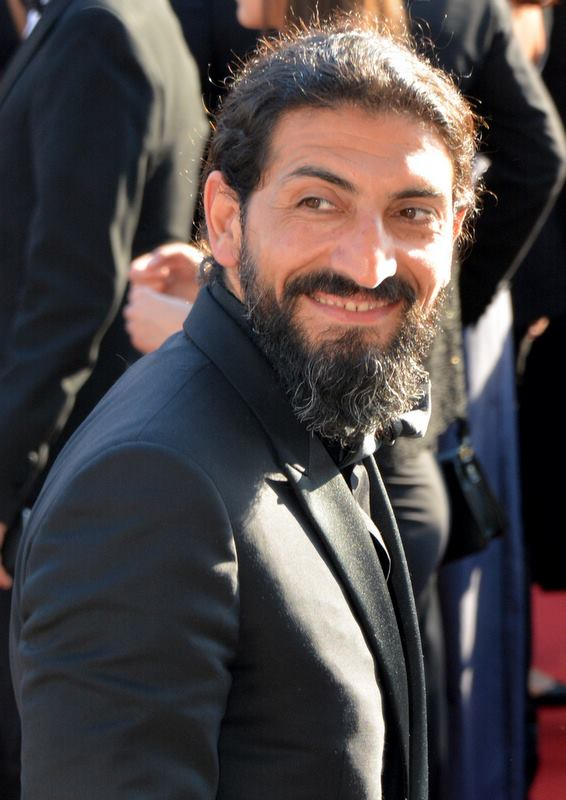
Maury Sterling, Nimrat Kaur and Numan Acar (left to right) portray Max Piotrowski, Tasneem Qureishi and Haissam Haqqani, respectively.
- Claire Danes as Carrie Mathison, a former CIA case officer and station chief
- Maury Sterling as Max Piotrowski, a surveillance expert and Carrie's trusted associate
- Costa Ronin as Yevgeny Gromov, a Russian GRU officer
- Nimrat Kaur as Tasneem Qureishi, the head of the Pakistani Inter-Services Intelligence agency
- Numan Acar as Haissam Haqqani, the head of the Taliban
- Linus Roache as David Wellington, the White House Chief of Staff
- Mandy Patinkin as Saul Berenson, Carrie's former boss and mentor, and the National Security Advisor

=== Recurring ===
- Mohammad Bakri as Abdul Qadir G'ulom, the Vice President and, later, President of Afghanistan
- Tim Guinee as Scott Ryan, chief of special operations at the CIA
- Andrea Deck as Jenna Bragg, a CIA field agent in Kabul early in her career
- Cliff Chamberlain as Mike Dunne, the CIA station chief in Kabul
- Charles Brice as Staff Sergeant John Durkin, a U.S. Army soldier serving in Afghanistan
- Sam Chance as Specialist Drew Soto, serving in Afghanistan
- Octavio Rodriguez as Specialist Arturo Gonzales, a U.S. Army soldier serving in Afghanistan
- Victor Almanzar as Staff Sergeant Justin Wenzel, a U.S. Army soldier serving in Afghanistan
- Jason Tottenham as Alan Yager, a CIA field agent in Kabul
- Emilio Cuesta as Specialist Charlie Stoudt, a U.S. Army soldier serving in Afghanistan
- Art Malik as Bunran Latif, a retired Pakistani general
- Sam Trammell as Benjamin Hayes, the vice president and later President of the United States
- Elham Ehsas as Jalal Haqqani, Haissam's rebellious son
- Alex Brockdorff as Parker, leader of a covert CIA team
- Seear Kohi as Balach, a Taliban lieutenant loyal to Haissam Haqqani
- Eugene Lee as General Mears
- Terry Serpico as General Owens, a U.S. Army general serving in Afghanistan
- Tracy Shayne as Janet Gaeto, U.S. Ambassador to Afghanistan
- Mustafa Haidari as Firooz
- Karen Pittman as Vanessa Kroll, an FBI agent
- Hugh Dancy as John Zabel, a foreign policy advisor to the President of the United States

=== Guest ===
- Mohammad Amiri as Arman, a friend of Carrie's in Kabul
- Kevork Malikyan as Agha Jan
- Anna Kathryn Holbrook as Robin
- David Hunt as Jim Turrow, a senior CIA counterintelligence official
- Jonjo O'Neill as Doug, a CIA counterintelligence official evaluating Carrie during her stay in Germany
- Anna Francolini as Dr. Foley, Carrie's psychiatrist in Germany
- Sitara Attaie as Samira Noori, a woman who provides Carrie information against G'ulom
- Beau Bridges as Ralph Warner, the President of the United States
- Christopher Maleki as President Daoud, the President of Afghanistan
- Michael Rabe as Chief Mechanic Worley
- Sharif Dorani as Barlas
- Austin Basis as Lonnie
- Kate Burton as Doris Warner, Ralph Warner's wife
- Zineb Triki as Judge Haziq Qadir
- Adnan Jaffar as General Aziz
- Elya Baskin as Viktor Makarov, Russian Ambassador to the United States
- Samrat Chakrabarti as Ambassador Rashad, Pakistan Ambassador to the United States
- Chris Bauer as Kevin Dance
- Ben Savage as young Saul Berenson
- Robin McLeavy as Charlotte Benson, a Russian operative daylighting as a real estate agent. Jennifer Ferrin portrayed the character in season 7.
- Merab Ninidze as Sergei Mirov, head of the GRU
- Tatyana Mukha as Anna Pomerantseva, lead interpreter for the GRU
  - Julie Engelbrecht as young Anna Pomerantseva
- Robert Clotworthy as Judge
- Amy Hargreaves as Maggie Mathison, Carrie's sister
- Jacqueline Antaramian as Dorit, Saul's sister who lives in the West Bank
- Jon Lindstrom as Claude Geroux, a shopkeeper and old friend of Saul's

Kamasi Washington makes a special appearance in the series finale.

== Episodes ==
No. overall	No. in season	Title	Directed by	Written by	Original release date	Prod. code	U.S. viewers (millions)
85	1	"Deception Indicated"	Lesli Linka Glatter	Debora Cahn & Alex Gansa	February 9, 2020	8WAH01	0.60
Following her release from captivity in Russia, Carrie recovers at a hospital in Germany. Her poor performance on a polygraph test stirs concern among CIA officials that she may have betrayed her country during her months in captivity, most of which she cannot remember. Saul leads the U.S. effort to end the war in Afghanistan, but negotiations collapse when Vice President Abdul Qadir G'ulom refuses the proposed terms. Saul recruits Carrie to join him in Kabul to help salvage peace talks. Carrie learns that one of her former assets was executed by the Taliban on treason charges, and begins to worry about what she may have revealed during her captivity. Her concerns are exacerbated when Kabul station chief Mike Dunne confirms that Russia shares information with the Taliban. The next day, on her way to meet G'ulom, Carrie sees Yevgeny Gromov leave G'ulom's office.
86	2	"Catch and Release"	Lesli Linka Glatter	Patrick Harbinson & Chip Johannessen	February 16, 2020	8WAH02	0.68
Carrie receives an anonymous tip regarding Samira Noori, an activist against G'ulom's regime whose husband died in a car bombing likely intended for her. Carrie searches Samira's apartment and finds evidence Samira collected on G'ulom's embezzlement of military funds. She uses this to leverage G'ulom to reverse his stance and release 1,000 Taliban prisoners per the peace deal. Carrie is later met by Yevgeny, who reveals himself as the source of the anonymous tip. Max intercepts Taliban communications, which capture now-leader Haissam Haqqani expressing his interest in ending the war; Saul sees an opportunity to negotiate with Haqqani. Tasneem Qureishi, now the head of the ISI, resolves to disrupt Saul's negotiations. During Saul's planned meeting with Haqqani in Peshawar, the ISI ambush Haqqani's convoy. Saul is captured and brought to Haqqani.
87	3	"False Friends"	Keith Gordon	Alex Gansa & Howard Gordon	February 23, 2020	8WAH03	0.71
Saul convinces Haqqani that the ISI was responsible for the ambush of his convoy and that a traitor in Haqqani's camp must have leaked information about the meeting. Haqqani deduces that his last living son, Jalal, betrayed him to Tasneem because he is opposed to the peace talks. Haqqani exiles Jalal from their household and agrees to the terms of the peace deal. Jalal is picked up by Tasneem. Carrie agrees to a meeting with Yevgeny, which Mike uses to test her allegiance, but Yevgeny arranges to meet her at a location where the CIA is unable to listen in on their conversation. He says he wants to renew a relationship they developed in Moscow, of which she has no memory; he apologizes for leaving Carrie alone in the asylum and tells her he later saved her life by preventing her from committing suicide. He says they became close and, as proof, reveals that Carrie told him she once considered drowning Franny. Carrie tells Mike it is unclear whether Yevgeny can be recruited as a CIA asset, but she should stay in Kabul to find out.
88	4	"Chalk One Up"	Seith Mann	Patrick Harbinson & Chip Johannessen	March 1, 2020	8WAH04	0.73
Carrie learns Mike has a recording of her meeting with Yevgeny that agents are trying to decipher. She is taken to Bagram Airfield, where Saul tells her President Warner is arriving in Kabul to announce the end of the war in person and wants to speak to her; on arriving, Warner thanks her for her service, referring to her ordeal in Moscow, and says he wants to give her a position in the White House on their return to Washington. He departs for Combat Outpost Steedley, where Max is stationed, to make the announcement there alongside Afghan President Daoud. Meanwhile, Carrie saves Samira from being kidnapped by her Taliban brother-in-law, who intends to forcibly marry her after her husband's death. On its way back from the military outpost, the helicopter carrying Warner and Daoud disappears off the CIA's radar; its wreckage is discovered in a forest by the crew of an escort helicopter, who spot Taliban soldiers in the area and open fire. In response, the Taliban shoot down the second helicopter with an RPG blast.
89	5	"Chalk Two Down"	Alex Graves	Patrick Harbinson & Chip Johannessen	March 8, 2020	8WAH05	0.82
Troops from Combat Outpost Steedley, accompanied by Max, arrive at the site of the helicopter crash and confirm that Presidents Warner and Daoud have both been killed. General G'ulom inherits the Afghan presidency and unilaterally declares martial law, ordering his army to apprehend Haqqani, whom he blames for the presidents' deaths. Saul warns Haqqani, believing him to be innocent, but Haqqani is unable to flee Kabul. Carrie learns that Warner's helicopter was switched at the last minute, but determines that it was a routine swap, leading her to speculate that the crash of the helicopter the presidents were in may have been an accident. A massive Taliban attack risks overwhelming the U.S. troops; on Wellington's recommendation, Vice President Benjamin Hayes orders the site abandoned and bombed to avoid having the President's body fall into Taliban hands. Carrie contacts Max and tells him he first has to retrieve the helicopter's flight recorder so the cause of the crash can be determined; Max succeeds, but the entire squad is killed by the Taliban and he is forced to surrender.
90	6	"Two Minutes"	Tucker Gates	Debora Cahn	March 15, 2020	8WAH06	0.71
The Taliban fighter who captured Max holds him prisoner and sells off the contents of his backpack, including the flight recorder. Carrie asks Yevgeny to use his Taliban contacts to help locate Max, and she discreetly disables the CIA's electronic surveillance of the region for two minutes to allow him to do so. President G'ulom threatens to execute 300 Taliban prisoners if Haqqani does not surrender, and he manipulates the inexperienced Hayes, now President, into agreeing with his strongman tactics. Haqqani decides to surrender to the U.S. in hopes of obtaining a fair trial and shows up at the embassy. Mike informs Saul that the recording of Carrie's earlier conversation with Yevgeny proves she lied about the nature of her relationship with him, and he is concerned that she may have unwittingly helped Yevgeny assassinate President Warner. Saul confronts Carrie and says he is sending her back to Germany to continue her treatment, but Carrie slips away before boarding her plane and is picked up on the tarmac by Yevgeny.
91	7	"Fucker Shot Me"	Lesli Linka Glatter	Patrick Harbinson & Chip Johannessen	March 22, 2020	8WAH07	1.09
Saul turns Haqqani over to G'ulom, who releases his Taliban prisoners. President Hayes, wanting to be seen to be avenging Warner's death, refuses to allow Saul to release a classified recording that would prove Haqqani's innocence. Yevgeny helps Carrie find Max, who tells her the flight recorder was taken to nearby Kohat, but he is then removed to a different location. Carrie and Yevgeny follow him to the second location; Carrie calls Mike to request a special ops team to extract Max, but decides to go in herself when they fail to arrive. She sees Haqqani's son, Jalal, standing behind a camera while Jalal's men force Max into an orange jumpsuit; Yevgeny stops her from intervening. With Haqqani's trial approaching, Saul convinces Tasneem to help him prove Haqqani's innocence to avoid bloodshed. They persuade the presiding judge in the case to grant a continuance, but she is replaced on the day of the trial, in which Haqqani is summarily found guilty and sentenced to death.
92	8	"Threnody(s)"	Michael Klick	Patrick Harbinson & Chip Johannessen	March 29, 2020	8WAH08	0.75
Jalal threatens to execute Max if Haqqani dies. President Hayes requests and obtains a 24-hour stay of Haqqani's execution from G'ulom so that an attempt can be made to rescue Max first, but John Zabel, his hawkish new foreign policy advisor, convinces Hayes to reverse course. Haqqani is executed and Carrie sees Jalal shoot Max. Jalal attends a Taliban leadership council meeting in Miranshah, Pakistan and sways the other participants to support him by making a speech in which he falsely claims to have shot down both American helicopters. Zabel obtains a video of Jalal's speech and uses it to persuade Hayes to threaten Pakistan: if it does not arrest Jalal and turn him over, U.S. forces will come to get him. Saul arrives with a special ops team to retrieve Max's body; Carrie informs him that Max gave her the flight recorder's location, and he says he will work with her to find it. After the special ops team tries to arrest her despite Saul's intervention, Carrie leaves with Yevgeny.
93	9	"In Full Flight"	Dan Attias	Alex Gansa & Howard Gordon	April 5, 2020	8WAH09	0.81
Saul is recalled to Washington, where he learns that Zabel now has the President's ear. Tasneem attempts to convince Jalal to go into hiding, but Jalal, empowered by the bolstered ranks of the Taliban, refuses. Tasneem decides that the ISI's best course of action is to protect Jalal and have the military deal with the U.S.'s threat. Pakistan begins moving its mobile nuclear missile launchers to the Afghan border in response to a U.S. troop surge there, and Zabel manipulates President Hayes into preparing for an airstrike to neutralize them. Carrie and Yevgeny search bazaars in Kohat for the flight recorder while evading a CIA team sent to capture her. Carrie gets the location of the team's safehouse and has Yevgeny direct the local police there to apprehend them, giving her time to find the flight recorder. She tracks down a broker who has it and, slipping away from Yevgeny, buys it from him with money sent by Saul; Yevgeny finds her and together they listen to the recording, which confirms that the presidents' helicopter crashed because of a mechanical failure. Yevgeny sedates Carrie and confiscates the recorder.
94	10	"Designated Driver"	Michael Offer	Patrick Harbinson & Chip Johannessen	April 12, 2020	8WAH10	0.89
Carrie reports to Saul that the helicopter crash resulted from a mechanical failure and that the Russians are now in possession of the flight recorder. Saul reaches out to the Russian ambassador, who denies that Russia has the recorder, but Saul realizes the Russians do have it but have no interest in trading it. Carrie is taken by force to meet Yevgeny, who offers to return the flight recorder to her in exchange for the identity of an agent Saul has had in the Kremlin for decades; Saul would never give an asset up, so Carrie will have to uncover the agent's identity herself. Carrie turns herself in at the CIA's Kabul station, where she is arrested and put on a plane back to the U.S. Hoping to de-escalate the rising political tensions between the U.S. and Pakistan, Wellington negotiates the release of the special ops team captured in Kohat. However, Jalal coerces one of his father's former top advisors, whose loyalty to Jalal is in doubt, to kill them in a suicide bombing at the Afghanistan-Pakistan border as they are about to be released.
95	11	"The English Teacher"	Michael Cuesta	Patrick Harbinson & Chip Johannessen	April 19, 2020	8WAH11	0.96
In Washington, Carrie faces a long list of federal charges, but Saul has her released and arranges for her to stay with him. Saul pleads with Tasneem to provide the U.S. with Jalal's location to defuse the situation. Zabel announces to Saul that Pakistan has given them the location, asserting it was the pressure he advocated that made this possible; a U.S. airstrike destroys the target. Searching for Saul's Russian asset, Carrie visits Andrei Kuznetsov, an agent Saul exfiltrated from East Berlin in 1987; he tells her his entire KGB cadet class were executed because of his defection. It is revealed in flashbacks that Saul's asset is Anna Pomerantseva, the English teacher of Kuznetsov's class, who offered to replace Kuznetsov as Saul's agent after the executions. Anna is now the GRU's head interpreter and is with a Russian delegation at the United Nations. She informs Saul that Yevgeny has already named his price for the flight recorder. Carrie arranges a meeting with Yevgeny to tell him what she has found, but she is still unable to identify the asset. Yevgeny proposes an alternative way to neutralize the asset: eliminate Saul.
96	12	"Prisoners of War"	Lesli Linka Glatter	Alex Gansa & Howard Gordon	April 26, 2020	8WAH12	1.26
After being told that Jalal was nowhere near the bombed site, President Hayes threatens to destroy Pakistan's missile launchers; Pakistan responds by announcing it has armed its nuclear warheads. After failing to get Saul to name his asset, Carrie sedates him and leaves him temporarily under GRU guard, then flies to the West Bank and tells Saul's sister Dorit he is dead; Dorit gives Carrie a USB drive containing a video message in which Saul identifies Anna as his asset, his intention having been to pass Anna on to Carrie should he die. Carrie shows the video to Yevgeny, who reports the information to his superior at the UN meeting. Saul warns Anna, who kills herself to avoid capture and torture. Russia plays the recording from the flight recorder publicly, successfully averting nuclear war between the U.S. and Pakistan. Two years later, Carrie and Yevgeny are living together in Moscow. Saul receives an envelope containing an advance copy of a book Carrie has written denouncing the U.S.; in it, he finds a hidden message from Carrie indicating that a Russian missile defense system can be defeated and that she will explain how in a future message.

== Production ==
The eighth season was ordered back-to-back with season 7 in August 2016. In April 2018, Claire Danes confirmed that season 8 would be the last, and Showtime officially confirmed the final season in August. In April 2018, showrunner Alex Gansa stated his plans for the final season, "Season 8 will be overseas somewhere. We get to play a story with larger national stakes in season 7 and we'll go back to a smaller intelligence-based season in 8." He also stated, "We're going to start fresh in season 8 and probably do a fairly big time jump between 7 and 8 and put any Trump parallels behind us" and "We'll tell a very contained story, hopefully in Israel." In January 2019, it was confirmed that the final season will take place in Afghanistan, with filming beginning in February in Morocco.

The season was originally planned to debut in June 2019, however, it was delayed until late 2019 "because of production demands of our international locations", per Showtime co-president Gary Levine. In August 2019, Showtime delayed the premiere again to February 2020; Levine stated, "Homeland is an ambitious series — especially in its final season. [Showrunner] Alex [Gansa] wants to go out proudly, and that has involved production in multiple countries at times and in places that have some issues. It just takes time." He added, "There have been no missteps. It's been a relatively smooth process. But it's a very ambitious production schedule and it has taken more time than we [anticipated]."

During an April 2020 interview on Homeland Season 8, Jalal Haqqani actor Elham Ehsas commented, "I think Haissam (Haqqani) was both Jalal’s biggest idol and biggest heartbreak."

== Reception ==
The eighth season received highly positive reviews. On Rotten Tomatoes, the season has an approval rating of 85% based on 102 reviews, with an average rating of 7.25/10. The site's critical consensus is, "Homeland returns to form with a tautly thrilling final season that fittingly finishes the job Carrie Mathison started all those years ago." On Metacritic, the season has a score of 71 out of 100 based on 10 critics, indicating "generally favorable" reviews.

Robert Rorke of the New York Post wrote, "The first three episodes are a bit clunky, with Carrie's familiar pattern of alienating nearly everyone she meets kicking in again – and then Episode 4 comes along and Homeland finds its groove." Ben Travers of IndieWire gave it a "B+" grade and praised the performances of Claire Danes and Mandy Patinkin, as well as the direction by Lesli Linka Glatter "for her beautifully staged and tensely cut action sequences".

=== Ratings ===
Viewership and ratings per episode of Homeland season 8
No.	Title	Air date	Rating (18–49)	Viewers (millions)
1	"Deception Indicated"	February 9, 2020	0.13	0.60
2	"Catch and Release"	February 16, 2020	0.10	0.68
3	"False Friends"	February 23, 2020	0.13	0.71
4	"Chalk One Up"	March 1, 2020	0.13	0.73
5	"Chalk Two Down"	March 8, 2020	0.13	0.82
6	"Two Minutes"	March 15, 2020	0.11	0.71
7	"Fucker Shot Me"	March 22, 2020	0.19	1.09
8	"Threnody(s)"	March 29, 2020	0.11	0.75
9	"In Full Flight"	April 5, 2020	0.13	0.81
10	"Designated Driver"	April 12, 2020	0.12	0.89
11	"The English Teacher"	April 19, 2020	0.18	0.96
12	"Prisoners of War"	April 26, 2020	0.24	1.26

=== Accolades ===
At the 72nd Primetime Emmy Awards, Lesli Linka Glatter received a nomination for Outstanding Directing for a Drama Series for the series finale "Prisoners of War". At the 11th Critics' Choice Television Awards, Claire Danes received a nomination for Best Actress in a Drama Series.
