= Fucker Shot Me =

- Homeland episode
- Episode no.: Season 8 Episode 7
- Directed by: Lesli Linka Glatter
- Written by: Chip Johannessen; Patrick Harbinson
- Production code: 8WAH07
- Original air date: March 22, 2020
- Running time: 54 minutes

Guest appearances
- Mohammad Bakri as Abdul Qadir G'ulom; Sam Trammell as President Ben Hayes; Art Malik as Bunran Latif; Tim Guinee as Scott Ryan; Kate Burton as Doris Warner; Andrea Deck as Jenna Bragg; Cliff Chamberlain as Mike Dunne; Elham Ehsas as Jalal Haqqani; Tracy Shayne as Ambassador Gaeto; Mustafa Haidari as Firooz; Zineb Triki as Judge Haziq Qadir; Sharif Dorani as Barlas; Nasser Memarzia as Presiding Judge; Hugh Dancy as John Zabel

Episode chronology
← Previous "Two Minutes"	Next → "Threnody(s)"
- Homeland season 8

"Fucker Shot Me" is the seventh episode of the eighth season of the American television drama series Homeland, and the 91st episode overall. It premiered on Showtime on March 22, 2020.

== Plot ==
Yevgeny (Costa Ronin) takes Carrie (Claire Danes) to the location where Max (Maury Sterling) is being held. Carrie briefly speaks with Max, who tells her what happened to the flight recorder. Yevgeny tries to negotiate Max's release, but instead Max is abruptly taken to a new location. Yevgeny and Carrie follow the group.

A date for Haqqani's (Numan Acar) trial is set. The United States has the recording of Haqqani's conversation with his son about wanting to end the war. Saul (Mandy Patinkin) wishes to formally enter the recording as evidence, but is forbidden by President Hayes (Sam Trammell). Saul and Tasneem (Nimrat Kaur) successfully appeal to one of the judges (Zineb Triki) to grant a continuation. However, on the day of the trial, it becomes apparent that G'ulom (Mohammad Bakri) swapped judges at the last minute. With the new presiding judge (Nasser Memarzia), there is no pretense of a trial. Haqqani is immediately found guilty and sentenced to death. Saul calls Wellington (Linus Roache) and asks him to convince Hayes to intervene. Wellington replies with skepticism, explaining that Hayes just had a private conversation with G'ulom, and that his own influence on Hayes is slipping.

Observing the new hideout from afar, Carrie and Yevgeny see Jalal Haqqani (Elham Ehsas) arrive on the scene. Carrie calls Mike (Cliff Chamberlain) to request a special ops team be deployed to extract Max. Jalal asks Max if he knows who shot down the helicopter. Carrie sneaks closer to see if Max is still alive. She watches as Max is forced into an orange jumpsuit and being readied to be videotaped.

== Production ==
The episode was directed by executive producer Lesli Linka Glatter and co-written by executive producers Patrick Harbinson and Chip Johannessen.

== Reception ==
=== Reviews ===
Scott Von Doviak of The A.V. Club gave the episode a "B+" grade and commented "suddenly this does feel like a final season in the making. Things are coming full circle".

New York Magazine's Brian Tallerico rated the episode 3 out of 5 stars, and called it "kind of a thin episode. There’s some nice work by Claire Danes as Carrie is faced with reliving the repercussions of a major decision that she made back in season four, but we haven’t really moved the ball much down the field by the end of this episode".

=== Ratings ===
The original broadcast was watched by 1.09 million viewers.
