= The English Teacher (Homeland) =

- Homeland episode
- Episode no.: Season 8 Episode 11
- Directed by: Michael Cuesta
- Written by: Chip Johannessen; Patrick Harbinson
- Production code: 8WAH11
- Original air date: April 19, 2020
- Running time: 52 minutes

Guest appearances
- Tim Guinee as Scott Ryan; Sam Trammell as President Ben Hayes; Chris Bauer as Kevin Dance; Ben Savage as Young Saul; Andrea Deck as Jenna Bragg; Karen Pittman as Vanessa Kroll; Elya Baskin as Victor Makarov; Robin McLeavy as Charlotte Benson; Merab Ninidze as Mirov; Sergey Nasibov as Andrei Kuznetsov; Tatyana Mukha as Anna Pomerantseva; Julie Engelbrecht as Young Anna; Robert Clotworthy as Judge; Hugh Dancy as John Zabel

Episode chronology
← Previous "Designated Driver"	Next → "Prisoners of War"
- Homeland season 8

"The English Teacher" is the eleventh episode of the eighth season of the American television drama series Homeland, and the 95th episode overall. It is the penultimate episode of the series and premiered on Showtime on April 19, 2020.

== Plot ==
Carrie (Claire Danes), now facing almost a dozen federal charges, is released on bond into Saul's (Mandy Patinkin) custody. Carrie asks Saul if he has a Russian asset in the Kremlin, but stops short of revealing the offer from Yevgeny. Saul denies the existence of the asset. Carrie is not convinced and investigates on her own. She asks Jenna (Andrea Deck) to retrieve CIA documentation on an exfiltration mission in Berlin in 1987 that was orchestrated by Saul. This leads her to the man who was exfiltrated, Andrei Kuznetsov (Sergey Nasibov), who is now in witness protection. Carrie visits him to probe for information. Among other things, she learns Saul's method of communication with Andrei: a red leather book, moved in a bookstore to indicate when they would meet.

Flashback scenes reveal how Anna Pomerantseva (Tatyana Mukha) met Saul and volunteered to be an asset. An English teacher at the time, her entire class was executed because their classmate, Kuznetsov, defected.

In the present, Anna is at a United Nations summit in New York, working as a translator for Russian officials. Saul flies to New York and storms in as the meeting concludes, confronting Ambassador Makarov (Elya Baskin) and loudly demanding Russia's asking price for the flight recorder. Saul is quickly escorted out, but accomplishes his true objective: the Russian congregation discusses Yevgeny's dealings while Anna eavesdrops. Later, Saul receives a communiqué from Anna which reads, "The price has already been asked. It's Yevgeny Gromov's play."

Meanwhile, Carrie explores Saul's bookcase filled with red leather books. She discovers their method of communication (notes tucked in the bindings) and constructs a timeline of American intelligence coups from the collection of books. She arranges a call with Yevgeny (Costa Ronin) to report her findings, but not having yet nailed down the asset's identity, Carrie is unable to make a deal for the recorder. Yevgeny demands that his price must be met one way or another: by unveiling the asset’s identity or by eliminating the conduit by which the information is passed to the United States, which would mean killing Saul.

== Production ==
This episode saw the return of director Michael Cuesta, who was the series' lead director in its first two seasons. It was co-written by executive producers Patrick Harbinson and Chip Johannessen.

Actor Ben Savage, who in this episode portrays Saul Berenson in flashbacks, previously played a younger version of Mandy Patinkin's character Jason Gideon on an episode of Criminal Minds.

== Reception ==
=== Reviews ===
The episode received an approval rating of 83% on the review aggregator Rotten Tomatoes based on six reviews.

Brian Tallerico of New York rated the episode 4 out of 5 stars, calling the scene with Carrie and Jenna "a fascinating sequence", and Carrie's deciphering of Saul's library as "expertly edited". Den of Geek's David Crow rated the episode 4.5 out of 5 stars, writing about the scene where Carrie is arraigned: "Claire Danes is terrific in this moment" and "the look of defeat and dawning horror on Carrie’s face is heartbreaking and infectious". Crow also reacted to Yevgeny's proposal to Carrie: "this twist makes the heavy handedness of last week’s ultimatum seem chillingly logical and tactically brilliant".

=== Ratings ===
The original broadcast was watched by 958,000 viewers.
