= Designated Driver (Homeland) =

- Homeland episode
- Episode no.: Season 8 Episode 10
- Directed by: Michael Offer
- Written by: Chip Johannessen; Patrick Harbinson
- Production code: 8WAH10
- Original air date: April 12, 2020
- Running time: 57 minutes

Guest appearances
- Sam Trammell as President Ben Hayes; Cliff Chamberlain as Mike Dunne; Andrea Deck as Jenna Bragg; Jason Tottenham as Alan Yager; Mohammad Amiri as Arman; Elham Ehsas as Jalal Haqqani; Seear Kohi as Balach; Alex Brockdorff as Parker; Karen Pittman as Vanessa Kroll; Elya Baskin as Victor Makarov; Michael Rabe as Chief Mechanic Worley; Samrat Chakrabarti as Ambassador Rashad; Hugh Dancy as John Zabel

Episode chronology
← Previous "In Full Flight"	Next → "The English Teacher"
- Homeland season 8

"Designated Driver" is the tenth episode of the eighth season of the American television drama series Homeland, and the 94th episode overall. It premiered on Showtime on April 12, 2020.

== Plot ==
Recalling what she heard on the flight recorder, Carrie (Claire Danes) touches base with Chief Mechanic Worley (Michael Rabe), who confirms that the pilots' verbiage indicates a mechanical failure in the helicopter, upon which they were forced to attempt a landing on mountainous terrain. Carrie reports this to Saul (Mandy Patinkin), along with the fact that the Russian government is now in possession of the flight recorder. Saul makes inquiries via the Russian ambassador Victor Makarov (Elya Baskin) as to what is Russia's asking price to trade back the recorder. Saul infers from the ambassador's cryptic responses that they have the recorder but are not interested in trading it.

A disastrous meeting between President Hayes (Sam Trammell) and Ambassador Rashad (Samrat Chakrabarti) from Pakistan only increases the likelihood of nuclear conflict between the countries. Wellington (Linus Roache) takes Rashad aside and, in order to de-escalate the situation, suggests that Pakistan release the U.S. special ops team that was arrested in Kohat.

Jalal (Elham Ehsas) plots an attack on the United States, against the advice of his second-in-command Balach (Seear Kohi). Jalal orders that a car be filled with explosives which will be driven into the target. Not satisfied with Balach's loyalty, Jalal commands that Balach himself will drive the car and die a martyr, or else his family will be killed.

Carrie is accosted by Yevgeny (Costa Ronin) after searching his now-empty apartment. Yevgeny makes her an offer: the only thing more valuable to Russia than the flight recorder is the identity of a double agent that Saul has placed very highly inside the Kremlin. Carrie then goes to the CIA station in Kabul and turns herself in. After a brief interrogation, Carrie demands a lawyer. She is immediately arrested and put on a plane to be extradited to the United States.

Jenna (Andrea Deck) travels to the Afghanistan-Pakistan border to greet the special ops team when they are released. Balach, sitting in the car loaded with explosives, records a final message to his family on his phone. He drives at high speed towards his target, which is the bus containing Parker (Alex Brockdorff) and the special ops soldiers. Border guards open fire on the car, attempting to stop him, but he crashes into the bus, triggering an explosion.

== Production ==
The episode was directed by Michael Offer and co-written by executive producers Patrick Harbinson and Chip Johannessen.

== Reception ==
=== Reviews ===
Brian Tallerico of New York magazine rated the episode 4 out of 5 stars, and placed into context the episode's climactic car bombing: "the brilliance of this very strong season has been in how the writers have captured that events like suicide bombings don’t exist in a vacuum as a singular event — they are the culmination of dozens of decisions on both sides".

Den of Geek's David Crow felt that "this episode feels ultimately like it’s setting a table. While it answers the question of what will be Yevgeny’s pound of flesh, it otherwise is about putting its chess pieces in place for the final movement".

=== Ratings ===
The original broadcast was watched by 893,000 viewers.
