= Threnody(s) =

- Homeland episode
- Episode no.: Season 8 Episode 8
- Directed by: Michael Klick
- Written by: Chip Johannessen; Patrick Harbinson
- Production code: 8WAH08
- Original air date: March 29, 2020
- Running time: 49 minutes

Guest appearances
- Mohammad Bakri as Abdul Qadir G'ulom; Sam Trammell as President Ben Hayes; Tim Guinee as Scott Ryan; Cliff Chamberlain as Mike Dunne; Andrea Deck as Jenna Bragg; Elham Ehsas as Jalal Haqqani; Seear Kohi as Balach; Hilary Jardine as Claudette Fletcher; Mitchell Hall as ESU Lieutenant Marcus; Mustafa Haidari as Firooz; Hugh Dancy as John Zabel

Episode chronology
← Previous "Fucker Shot Me"	Next → "In Full Flight"
- Homeland season 8

"Threnody(s)" is the eighth episode of the eighth season of the American television drama series Homeland, and the 92nd episode overall. It premiered on Showtime on March 29, 2020.

== Plot ==
President Hayes (Sam Trammell) receives word that Jalal (Elham Ehsas) will execute Max (Maury Sterling) if Haqqani's (Numan Acar) death sentence is carried out. Hayes convinces G'ulom (Mohammad Bakri) to grant a stay of execution while a rescue mission is conducted, but he abandons that plan on advice from John Zabel (Hugh Dancy), his brash new foreign policy advisor. Haqqani is eventually killed by firing squad. Jalal and his men subsequently kill Max and leave the scene. Carrie (Claire Danes) calls Saul (Mandy Patinkin) to report what happened to Max. She opts to wait with Max's body and return with Saul when he arrives. Yevgeny (Costa Ronin) stays with her as she mourns Max.

Wellington (Linus Roache) and Zabel are tasked to draft a speech for Hayes: a non-aggressive one that Zabel is displeased with. In Kabul, Jalal seizes control of the Taliban with a speech in which he claims to have shot down both of the helicopters. A video of Jalal's speech is acquired by Claudette Fletcher (Hilary Jardine), a friend of Zabel. Armed with the video, Zabel is able to pivot Hayes away from the original speech. In a national address, Hayes announces that Jalal was responsible for killing the president, and that Pakistan must turn him over immediately, or face an attack from the United States.

Saul arrives with a special ops team to retrieve Max's body and tells Carrie about the impending war with Pakistan. Carrie replies that Max gave her the location of the flight recorder, which could clarify whether Jalal is truly culpable for the attack on the helicopters. As they are leaving, the soldiers accompanying Saul begin to place Carrie under arrest, contrary to Saul's orders. Carrie pulls her own gun, leading to a standoff. Yevgeny alerts the Americans to his presence by firing his weapon into the air; Carrie is able to retreat back to his car, and they drive away.

== Production ==
The episode was directed by executive producer Michael Klick and co-written by executive producers Patrick Harbinson and Chip Johannessen. The episode marks the final appearances of Numan Acar and Maury Sterling as Haissam Haqqani and Max Piotrowski, respectively, with the latter having performed the role since the series' pilot episode.

== Reception ==
=== Reviews ===
The A.V. Club's Scott Von Doviak gave the episode a "B" grade, praising the scene where Carrie laments Max: "Carrie has less to do in this episode than most, but Claire Danes does get one terrific scene out of her limited time... The way Danes plays it, this is a slowly dawning, horrific realization for Carrie, with implications that extend far beyond Max himself."

David Crow of Den of Geek rated the episode 3 out of 5 stars, citing the same scene as the highlight of an otherwise flawed episode, saying it "elevates tonight’s Homeland above its otherwise labored and overwrought plot machinations".

=== Ratings ===
The original broadcast was watched by 749,000 viewers.
