= Catch and Release (Homeland) =

- Homeland episode
- Episode no.: Season 8 Episode 2
- Directed by: Lesli Linka Glatter
- Written by: Chip Johannessen; Patrick Harbinson
- Production code: 8WAH02
- Original air date: February 16, 2020
- Running time: 50 minutes

Guest appearances
- Mohammad Bakri as Abdul Qadir G'ulom; Andrea Deck as Jenna Bragg; Art Malik as Bunran Latif; Tim Guinee as Scott Ryan; Cliff Chamberlain as Mike Dunne; Charles Brice as Staff Sergeant John Durkin; Octavio Rodriguez as Specialist Arturo Gonzales; Sam Chance as Specialist Drew Soto; Jason Tottenham as Alan Yager; Sitara Attaie as Samira Noori; Ash Goldeh as Omar; Jaylen Moore as Eric Baraz; Emilio Cuesta as Specialist Charlie Stoudt; Fehd Benchemsi as Talib

Episode chronology
← Previous "Deception Indicated"	Next → "False Friends"
- Homeland season 8

"Catch and Release" is the second episode of the eighth season of the American television drama series Homeland, and the 86th episode overall. It premiered on Showtime on February 16, 2020.

== Plot ==
Carrie (Claire Danes) finds a note on her desk that says "Samira Noori". After investigating her background, Carrie discovers that Samira's husband died in a car bombing, likely intended for Samira herself who was investigating Vice President G'ulom in a corruption probe at the time. Jenna (Andrea Deck) stages a fake job interview with Samira while Carrie searches her apartment. Carrie finds evidence that Samira acquired which proves that G'ulom misappropriated a massive amount of funds earmarked for a military base. With this leverage, she is able to compel G'ulom (Mohammad Bakri) to reverse his stance and release the prisoners in accordance with the peace negotiations.

Tasneem (Nimrat Kaur) visits her stepfather Bunran Latif (Art Malik) and relates her suspicions about Saul's actions. They deduce Saul's plan to negotiate directly with Haqqani. Latif implores Tasneem to do everything in her power to disrupt the negotiations.

Saul (Mandy Patinkin) gets a message delivered to Haqqani (Numan Acar), asking him to meet in Peshawar. While Saul waits at the rendezvous, Max (Maury Sterling) alerts him from intercepted communications that the ISI are rapidly converging on Saul's location. Saul realizes that their target is Haqqani's convoy, which is struck by an RPG. In the aftermath, Saul is captured and delivered to Haqqani who was not in the convoy, but had sent it as a decoy. Haqqani then strikes Saul with the butt of his rifle.

At a bar after hours, Carrie is greeted by Yevgeny (Costa Ronin), who reveals that he was the one who left the note on her desk.

== Production ==
The episode was directed by executive producer Lesli Linka Glatter and co-written by executive producers Patrick Harbinson and Chip Johannessen.

== Reception ==
=== Reviews ===
Brian Tallerico of New York Magazine rated the episode 4 out of 5 stars, while commenting on the general tone: "There’s a world-weariness to the start of this season of Homeland befitting the final run of a show about the current state of the tired world... It’s a nice tone to use for the final season, although it could get a little wearying for viewers if it holds too long".

The A.V. Club's Scott Von Doviak gave the episode a "B" grade, and noted that as the second episode in the season, it had to dump a lot of information, thus "we’re mostly watching a series of meetings and phone calls, at least until things get percolating again toward episode’s end".

=== Ratings ===
The original broadcast was watched by 675,000 viewers.
