= Paean to the People =

- Homeland episode
- Episode no.: Season 7 Episode 12
- Directed by: Lesli Linka Glatter
- Written by: Alex Gansa
- Production code: 7WAH12
- Original air date: April 29, 2018
- Running time: 63 minutes

Guest appearances
- James D'Arcy as Thomas Anson; Dylan Baker as Senator Sam Paley; Costa Ronin as Yevgeny Gromov; Sandrine Holt as Simone Martin; Ellen Adair as Janet Bayne; Catherine Curtin as Sandy Langmore; Geoff Pierson as Senator Richard Eames; Elya Baskin as Viktor; Merab Ninidze as Sergei Mirov; Clé Bennett as Doxie Marquis; Ari Fliakos as Carter Bennet; Damian Young as Jim; Peter Vack as Clint Prower; Yosef Podolski as Aleksandr; Sue Jean Kim; Beau Bridges as Vice President Ralph Warner

Episode chronology
← Previous "All In"	Next → "Deception Indicated"
- Homeland season 7

"Paean to the People" is the seventh-season finale of the American television drama series Homeland, and the 84th episode overall. It premiered on Showtime on April 29, 2018.

== Plot ==
In Moscow, Saul (Mandy Patinkin) and his team arrive at the airport, ready to fly Simone (Sandrine Holt) to the United States. Meanwhile, Yevgeny Gromov (Costa Ronin) tracks the disguised Carrie (Claire Danes), still believing she is Simone. Carrie's car is cornered, so she runs away on foot in an effort to extend the chase until Saul's plane has taken off. Saul's vehicle is stopped at a checkpoint due to an outstanding warrant for Bennet's (Ari Fliakos) arrest for killing one of the guards at Simone's previous safehouse; Saul calls Acting President Warner (Beau Bridges) for assistance. Senator Paley (Dylan Baker), who is in the room with Warner, advises against this, as a successful retrieval of Simone would lead to Keane being reinstated as president. Warner angrily rebukes Paley and intervenes on Saul's behalf, demanding that Russian ambassador Viktor Makarov (Elya Baskin) allow Saul's group to leave Moscow. The plane takes flight as Yevgeny captures Carrie.

=== Three days later ===
Saul's attempts to negotiate Carrie's release with Viktor go nowhere. Simone's testimony confirms a GRU conspiracy to undermine President Keane. Paley is arrested as a conspirator; Keane (Elizabeth Marvel) visits him in jail, where he begs her to allow his family to receive his pension, but she merely spits on him in spite. Keane is triumphantly sworn in as president once again, but in her first public address, she resigns. She explains that as Russia was able to exploit partisan discord in the U.S., that must be addressed and that events of her administration have left her as someone the American people as a whole will be unable to trust.

Yevgeny asks an imprisoned Carrie to film a confession video stating that Simone was a CIA operative and that the U.S. orchestrated everything, threatening to withhold Carrie's medication if she does not cooperate. Carrie refuses.

=== Seven months later ===
Carrie's release is finally secured in exchange for several Russian prisoners. Saul and Jim (Damian Young), the head of the CIA's Moscow station, oversee the prisoner exchange at the Estonia–Russia border. After seven months of receiving no medication, Carrie is barely lucid and even seems not to recognize Saul.

== Production ==
The episode was directed by executive producer Lesli Linka Glatter and written by showrunner Alex Gansa.

== Reception ==
=== Reviews ===
The episode received an approval rating of 100% on the review aggregator Rotten Tomatoes based on 10 reviews. The website's critical consensus is, "'Paean to the People' demonstrates all that Homeland does best, delivering intelligent closure to the season's overarching plot while fleshing out the terrible cost of victory for Carrie Mathison."

The A.V. Club's Scott Von Doviak gave the episode a "B+" grade, concluding that it was "a mostly satisfying end to a bounce-back season", and that the "first twenty-five minutes or so is executed almost flawlessly, though, with the series’ steadiest hand, Lesli Linka Glatter, at the helm". Ben Travers of IndieWire's rated the finale "A", writing "Homeland delivered a cliffhanger ending without sacrificing closure in a finale that sets up an intriguing end-run".

=== Ratings ===
The original broadcast was watched by 1.3 million viewers.

=== Accolades ===
Alex Gansa won the Writers Guild of America Award for Television: Episodic Drama for the 71st Writers Guild of America Awards. Lesli Linka Glatter was nominated for Outstanding Directing – Drama Series at the 71st Directors Guild of America Awards.
