= Two Minutes =

- Homeland episode
- Episode no.: Season 8 Episode 6
- Directed by: Tucker Gates
- Written by: Debora Cahn
- Production code: 8WAH06
- Original air date: March 15, 2020
- Running time: 54 minutes

Guest appearances
- Mohammad Bakri as Abdul Qadir G'ulom; Sam Trammell as President Ben Hayes; Tim Guinee as Scott Ryan; Cliff Chamberlain as Mike Dunne; Andrea Deck as Jenna Bragg; Jason Tottenham as Alan Yager; Terry Serpico as General Owens; Seear Kohi as Balach; Mustafa Haidari as Firooz; Sharif Dorani as Barlas; Austin Basis as Lonnie; Karen Pittman as Vanessa Kroll; Adonis Kapsalis as First Guard

Episode chronology
| ← Previous "Chalk Two Down" | Next → "Fucker Shot Me" |
- Homeland season 8

"Two Minutes" is the sixth episode of the eighth season of the American television drama series Homeland, and the 90th episode overall. It premiered on Showtime on March 15, 2020.

== Plot ==
Max (Maury Sterling) is taken prisoner by a Taliban soldier and handcuffed to a bed. His captor takes Max's backpack to a traveling salesman and sells everything inside, including the flight recorder from the President's helicopter.

Carrie (Claire Danes) asks Yevgeny (Costa Ronin) to use his connections in the Taliban to find out if they are holding Max. Yevgeny agrees to do so, under the condition that Carrie finds a way to suspend the CIA's surveillance in that region while he makes a call. Carrie pulls it off by intentionally jamming the printer at the Kabul station and using this to distract Lonnie (Austin Basis) who was manning the surveillance computer.

President G'ulom (Mohammad Bakri) threatens to execute 300 Taliban prisoners if Haqqani (Numan Acar) does not turn himself in. President Hayes (Sam Trammell) makes a call to G'ulom, ostensibly to discourage him, but the inexperienced Hayes is instead manipulated by G'ulom into being sympathetic to this course of action. Haqqani decides to turn himself in, but into the United States' custody, in hopes of getting a fair trial.

Mike (Cliff Chamberlain) informs Saul (Mandy Patinkin) that Carrie's conversation with Yevgeny was recorded, and that Carrie subsequently lied in her reports about the relationship. Saul confronts Carrie, noting that her knowledge of the President's whereabouts while having regular contact with a Russian intelligence agent is extremely problematic given what happened. Carrie is escorted to a plane to be shipped back to Germany, but rather than boarding, she runs on to the tarmac where she is promptly picked up by Yevgeny.

== Production ==
The episode was directed by Tucker Gates and written by executive producer Debora Cahn.

== Reception ==
=== Reviews ===
The episode received an approval rating of 80% on the review aggregator Rotten Tomatoes based on five reviews.

New York Magazine's Brian Tallerico rated the episode 4 out of 5 stars, calling it "another solid episode that features one of the best scenes ever between Claire Danes and Mandy Patinkin", and continuing "Patinkin has been remarkable the last couple episodes, finding the subtle details in Saul that have long distinguished this performance".

David Crow of Den of Geek rated the episode 3.5 out of 5 stars, also praising the Danes/Patinkin scene, while criticizing some of the plot points as stretching believability.

=== Ratings ===
The original broadcast was watched by 706,000 viewers.
