= Deception Indicated =

- Homeland episode
- Episode no.: Season 8 Episode 1
- Directed by: Lesli Linka Glatter
- Written by: Alex Gansa; Debora Cahn
- Production code: 8WAH01
- Original air date: February 9, 2020
- Running time: 59 minutes

Guest appearances
- Mohammad Bakri as Abdul Qadir G'ulom; Tim Guinee as Scott Ryan; Andrea Deck as Jenna Bragg; Cliff Chamberlain as Mike Dunne; Charles Brice as Staff Sergeant John Durkin; Sam Chance as Specialist Drew Soto; Octavio Rodriguez as Specialist Arturo Gonzales; Victor Almanzar as Staff Sergeant Justin Wenzel; Mohammad Amiri as Arman; Jason Tottenham as Alan Yager; Kevork Malikyan as Agha Jan; Anna Kathryn Holbrook as Robin; David Hunt as Jim Turrow; Jonjo O'Neill as Doug; Emilio Cuesta as Specialist Charlie Stoudt; Anna Francolini as Dr. Foley

Episode chronology
← Previous "Paean to the People"	Next → "Catch and Release"
- Homeland season 8

"Deception Indicated" is the eighth season premiere of the American television drama series Homeland, and the 85th episode overall. It premiered on Showtime on February 9, 2020.

== Plot ==
While rehabilitating at Landstuhl Regional Medical Center, Carrie (Claire Danes) is interviewed by counterintelligence agent Jim Turrow (David Hunt). Turrow informs Carrie that she failed a polygraph test, and calls into question whether Carrie betrayed her loyalty during the months in captivity that she has no memory of.

Saul (Mandy Patinkin), having been retained as National Security Advisor by new president Warner, is leading the U.S. effort to end the war in Afghanistan. Negotiations fall apart when Afghanistan's Vice President, Abdul Qadir G'ulom (Mohammad Bakri), announces he will refuse to honor the proposed terms. Saul recruits Carrie to join him in Kabul to help salvage the peace talks, despite warnings from Carrie's caretakers at the hospital that she is not ready.

Max (Maury Sterling) joins a platoon of soldiers in Korangal Valley with the aim of repairing a listening device near the Pakistan border which intercepts Taliban communications. Their unit comes under fire, but Max is able to service the device, and confirms it is operational back at the base.

In Afghanistan, Carrie reunites with former colleague Mike Dunne (Cliff Chamberlain), now the station chief in Kabul, who assigns young agent Jenna Bragg (Andrea Deck) to shadow Carrie. Carrie visits the home of one of her former assets, but learns he was branded a traitor by the Taliban and publicly executed. Growing more concerned about what information she may have revealed while in captivity, she asks Mike whether Russia shares information with the Taliban; he confirms that they do. Carrie is further disturbed the next day when, while waiting to meet with G'ulom, she sees her Russian captor Yevgeny Gromov (Costa Ronin) coming out of G'ulom's office.

== Production ==
The episode was directed by executive producer Lesli Linka Glatter and co-written by showrunner Alex Gansa and executive producer Debora Cahn.

== Reception ==
=== Reviews ===
The episode received an approval rating of 100% on the review aggregator Rotten Tomatoes based on five reviews.

The A.V. Club's Scott Von Doviak gave the episode a "B+" grade, and praised the direction: "Homeland ratchets up to its tense, suspenseful best under series veteran Leslie Linka Glatter’s direction as the story cuts between Carrie’s attempt to secretly meet with an old asset and Max accompanied by troops into Taliban territory to carry out his mission". Emma Fraser of Collider said of the episode "Setting the stage before the final curtain, Homeland and Claire Danes have reminded audiences why we were so enraptured when it first debuted nearly 10 years ago".

=== Ratings ===
The original broadcast was watched by 600,000 viewers.
