= In Full Flight (Homeland) =

- Homeland episode
- Episode no.: Season 8 Episode 9
- Directed by: Dan Attias
- Written by: Alex Gansa; Howard Gordon
- Production code: 8WAH09
- Original air date: April 5, 2020
- Running time: 49 minutes

Guest appearances
- Sam Trammell as President Ben Hayes; Tim Guinee as Scott Ryan; Art Malik as Bunran Latif; Cliff Chamberlain as Mike Dunne; Andrea Deck as Jenna Bragg; Elham Ehsas as Jalal Haqqani; Jason Tottenham as Alan Yager; Seear Kohi as Balach; Narinder Samra as Kohat Electronics Vendor; Ismail Bashey as Major Zulfikar; Rikin Vasani as Saleem Sinai; Adnan Jaffar as General Aziz; Hugh Dancy as John Zabel

Episode chronology
← Previous "Threnody(s)"	Next → "Designated Driver"
- Homeland season 8

"In Full Flight" is the ninth episode of the eighth season of the American television drama series Homeland, and the 93rd episode overall. It premiered on Showtime on April 5, 2020.

== Plot ==
Carrie (Claire Danes) and Yevgeny (Costa Ronin) search the bazaars in Kohat looking for the flight recorder. Carrie finds Max's rucksack in one shop. The shopkeep (Narinder Samra) reluctantly admits that he recently sold the flight recorder to the broker Saleem Sinai (Rikin Vasani). Carrie offers a finders fee for him to arrange a re-sale with the broker at midnight.

The Pakistani government announces that they view the United States' threats as an act of war. In the situation room, Pakistan's mobile nuclear launchers are observed moving towards the Afghan border. President Hayes (Sam Trammell) expresses concern that Pakistan is not backing down, as Zabel (Hugh Dancy) had assured him.

Tasneem (Nimrat Kaur) visits Jalal (Elham Ehsas) in an attempt to convince him to go into hiding and avoid further provocation of the United States. Jalal, empowered by the now bolstered ranks of the Taliban, flatly refuses. Tasneem and Bunny (Art Malik) decide that their best course of action is to protect Jalal.

Carrie sneaks out at midnight to meet the broker without telling Yevgeny. Saul (Mandy Patinkin) wires her $999,999 which she uses to purchase the flight recorder. As she prepares to listen to the recording, she is surprised by the arrival of Yevgeny. They listen to the recording together which confirms that the Presidents' helicopter merely crashed due to a mechanical failure. Carrie asks for Yevgeny's help in delivering the recorder to the embassy in Islamabad. Yevgeny is standoffish, as Carrie was lying to him. They kiss, but Yevgeny then sedates Carrie with a needle. He and his men take away Carrie along with the flight recorder.

== Production ==
The episode was directed by Dan Attias and written by series co-creators Alex Gansa and Howard Gordon.

== Reception ==
=== Reviews ===
New York Magazine's Brian Tallerico rated the episode 4 out of 5 stars, and summarized: "leading up the momentous ending, “In Full Flight” is a relatively slow episode, working on rising tension with people on the edge of world-changing crisis, but it’s strong scene by scene".

David Crow of Den of Geek praised the episode, describing the scenes of Carrie acquiring the flight recorder as "deliciously tense", and the episode's final twist as "a hell of a development".

=== Ratings ===
The original broadcast was watched by 809,000 viewers.
