= Prisoners of War (Homeland) =

- Homeland episode
- Episode no.: Season 8 Episode 12
- Directed by: Lesli Linka Glatter
- Written by: Alex Gansa; Howard Gordon
- Production code: 8WAH12
- Original air date: April 26, 2020
- Running time: 68 minutes

Guest appearances
- Amy Hargreaves as Maggie Mathison; Tim Guinee as Scott Ryan; Sam Trammell as President Ben Hayes; Jacqueline Antaramian as Dorit; Robin McLeavy as Charlotte Benson; Merab Ninidze as Mirov; Tatyana Mukha as Anna Pomerantseva; Johnny Kostrey as Valeri; Anton Narinskiy as Tolya; Andrew Borba as Berkle; Jon Lindstrom as Claude; Joanna Triantafyllidou as Carrie's asset; Hugh Dancy as John Zabel; Special appearance by Kamasi Washington

Episode chronology
← Previous "The English Teacher"	Next → —
- Homeland season 8

"Prisoners of War" is the series finale of the American television drama series Homeland. It is the twelfth episode of the eighth season and the 96th episode overall. It premiered on Showtime on April 26, 2020. The episode's name is taken from the Israeli series on which Homeland was originally based.

== Plot ==
Carrie admits to Saul the deal she made: to give up Saul's Russian asset in exchange for the flight recorder. Carrie makes a plea to Saul for the asset's identity, but Saul refuses on the grounds that the United States' crucial intelligence capabilities in Russia would be eliminated. Carrie administers a paralytic agent to Saul, and signals two GRU operatives to come inside. The operatives place a helpless Saul on the bed and prepare to kill him via lethal injection. Carrie asks Saul for the asset's name one last time. Saul replies "go fuck yourself". With that, Carrie gives up the bluff. Saul is spared, but kept captive while Carrie flies to Israel.

In Israel, Carrie tells Saul's sister Dorit that Saul has died of a stroke. It is a ruse, with the aim of enacting Saul's 'legacy plan', in which his valued asset is passed on to Carrie in the event of his death. Indeed, Dorit has an envelope intended for Carrie which contains a USB drive. On the drive is a video in which Saul reveals to Carrie his asset, Anna Pomerantseva (Tatyana Mukha). Carrie shows the video to Yevgeny, who notifies GRU Director Mirov, who is at the U.N. summit with Anna. Saul is able to get a warning to Anna, who kills herself moments before the Russians arrive to take her into custody.

Having received the identity of the asset, Russia fulfills its end of the deal. Mirov makes a televised address in which he plays the cockpit recording, proving that President Warner's helicopter was not shot down. He publicly pressures the United States to stand down in Pakistan. President Hayes complies, and nuclear war is averted. Facing a litany of federal charges, Carrie flees to Russia with Yevgeny.

=== Two years later ===
Carrie and Yevgeny, now living together in Moscow, attend a jazz concert to celebrate the completion of Carrie's new book: Tyranny of Secrets: Why I Had to Betray My Country. During a bathroom break, Carrie discreetly swaps purses with another woman.

Saul receives a package addressed to "Professor Rabinow", the same alias via which Anna sent him information. Inside he finds an advance copy of Carrie's book. Recalling Anna's tradecraft, he looks inside the book's binding to find a note: "Greetings from Moscow, Professor. The Russian S-400 missile defense system sold to Iran and Turkey has a backdoor. It can be defeated. Specs to follow. Stay tuned." Saul smiles as he realizes that Carrie has become his new Russian asset.

== Production ==
The episode was directed by executive producer Lesli Linka Glatter and written by series co-creators Alex Gansa and Howard Gordon.

Although most of the season was shot in Morocco, production had to be moved to Los Angeles for this episode due to logistical issues. The final scene at the concert was filmed in Los Angeles Theatre, with the featured musician being Kamasi Washington.

Gansa described the internal tension when crafting the finale: "The conversations got intense about how far Carrie would go and how far she wouldn’t go.. everyone — cast members, directors, writers — was in a froth…. To say there was some free-floating anxiety would’ve been an understatement".

Some details of the finale were still in flux as filming approached. 24 hours before the finale was shot, Gansa, along with Claire Danes, settled on the idea of Carrie's authoring of a book denouncing the United States.

== Reception ==
=== Reviews ===
"Prisoners of War" received universal acclaim from critics, who praised its direction, performances (particularly those of Danes and Patinkin), and satisfying conclusion of the series' story. The episode received an approval rating of 100% on the review aggregator Rotten Tomatoes based on six reviews.

Richard Lawson of Vanity Fair wrote "I found something strangely moving about the way Homeland closed, its poetic ambivalence serving as a neat and satisfying representation of its most worrisome idea: that this will never end", and continued "What worked so well about Prisoners of War, I think, is how it stripped away some of the show’s brittle context and compacted itself into a character study".

The A.V. Club's Scott Von Doviak gave the episode an "A−" grade, while highlighting the confrontation between Saul and Carrie as "one last great Carrie/Saul scene, and an episode Mandy Patinkin is sure to submit as his Emmy reel".

Jim Hemphill, writing for Talkhouse, called it "one of the greatest series finales in the history of television". He continued "writer Alex Gansa and director Lesli Linka Glatter pulled off the rare trick of resolving almost a decade’s worth of storylines and relationships in a manner as unpredictable as it was completely satisfying".

=== Ratings ===
The original broadcast was watched by 1.26 million viewers.

=== Accolades ===
For the 72nd Primetime Emmy Awards, Lesli Linka Glatter received a nomination for Outstanding Directing for a Drama Series for this episode. For the 73rd Directors Guild of America Awards, Glatter won for Outstanding Directing – Drama Series for this episode.
