= Catch and release (disambiguation) =

Catch and release is a form of recreational fishing.

Catch and release may also refer to:

- Catch & Release (album), album by Matt Simons
  - "Catch & Release" (song), song by Matt Simons
- Catch and Release (2006 film), a romantic comedy film by Susannah Grant
- Catch and Release (2018 film), a drama film by Dominique Cardona and Laurie Colbert
- "Catch and Release" (Homeland), an episode of Homeland
- "Catch and Release" (Steven Universe), an episode of Steven Universe
- Catch and release, a practice in patent law
- Catch and release (immigration), a practice in United States immigration enforcement
- Trap–neuter–return, a strategy for controlling feral animal populations

== See also ==
- Capture and release (disambiguation)
