= Capture and release =

Capture and release may refer to:

- Catch and release, a recreational fishing practice
- Capture & Release, a 2005 drone metal album by Khanate
- Capture/Release, a 2005 post-punk album by The Rakes
- Trap–neuter–return, a strategy for controlling feral animal populations

== See also ==
- Catch and release (disambiguation)
