= Anna Holbrook =

American actress

- Born: Anna Kathryn York; April 18, 1957 (age 69); Fairbanks, Territory of Alaska, U.S.
- Occupation: Actress
- Years active: 1981–present
- Spouse: Bruce Holbrook (1979–present)
- Children: 2

Anna Kathryn Holbrook (née York; born April 18, 1957) is an American television actress, known for her role as Sharlene Frame Hudson on the NBC daytime soap opera Another World, for which she received Daytime Emmy Award for Outstanding Supporting Actress in a Drama Series in 1996.

== Life and career ==
Holbrook was born in Fairbanks, Alaska, and grew up in Tucson, Arizona. Holbrook's father, Don Joseph York (aged 29) was killed in South Vietnam during the Vietnamese War. Her mother, Johanna, later remarried. She began her career appearing in television series including Hart to Hart and Dallas. In 1988, she moved to New York City for performing on off-Broadway stage, and later was cast as Sharlene Frame Hudson on the NBC daytime soap opera, Another World a role she played until 1991 after her character was presumed dead in a boat explosion. Soap operas weren't in Holbrook's plans, but her agent offered some advice that would change her mind. She returned to soap in late 1993 and appeared until 1997, and again in 1999. The character Sharlene was a victim of sexual abuse and suffered from multiple personality disorder, and Holbrook won a Daytime Emmy Award for Outstanding Supporting Actress award for her portrayal in 1996.

Holbrook has appeared in numerous guest starring roles, including four different roles on Law & Order, three on Law & Order: Special Victims Unit between 1993 and 2006, Spin City, The West Wing, Bull, Unbreakable Kimmy Schmidt, Blue Bloods, Homeland (in the season eight episode "Deception Indicated"), Hunters, The Blacklist, Harlem and The Equalizer. She appeared in the 1994 comedy film I Love Trouble and in 2007 had a recurring role as Dr. Hannah Young on the ABC daytime soap opera One Life to Live for several episodes. In 2021, Holbrook played Debbie in the Sister Swap film franchise. She starred as the mother of real-life sisters Kimberly Williams-Paisley and Ashley Williams, who also happen to be the real-life daughters of Holbrook's real-life best friend.

== Personal life ==
Holbrook has been married to Bruce Holbrook since 1979, and they have two children. Anna is currently an acting teacher at the Performing Arts Conservatory in New Canaan, Connecticut.
