= Alex Brockdorff =

English actor

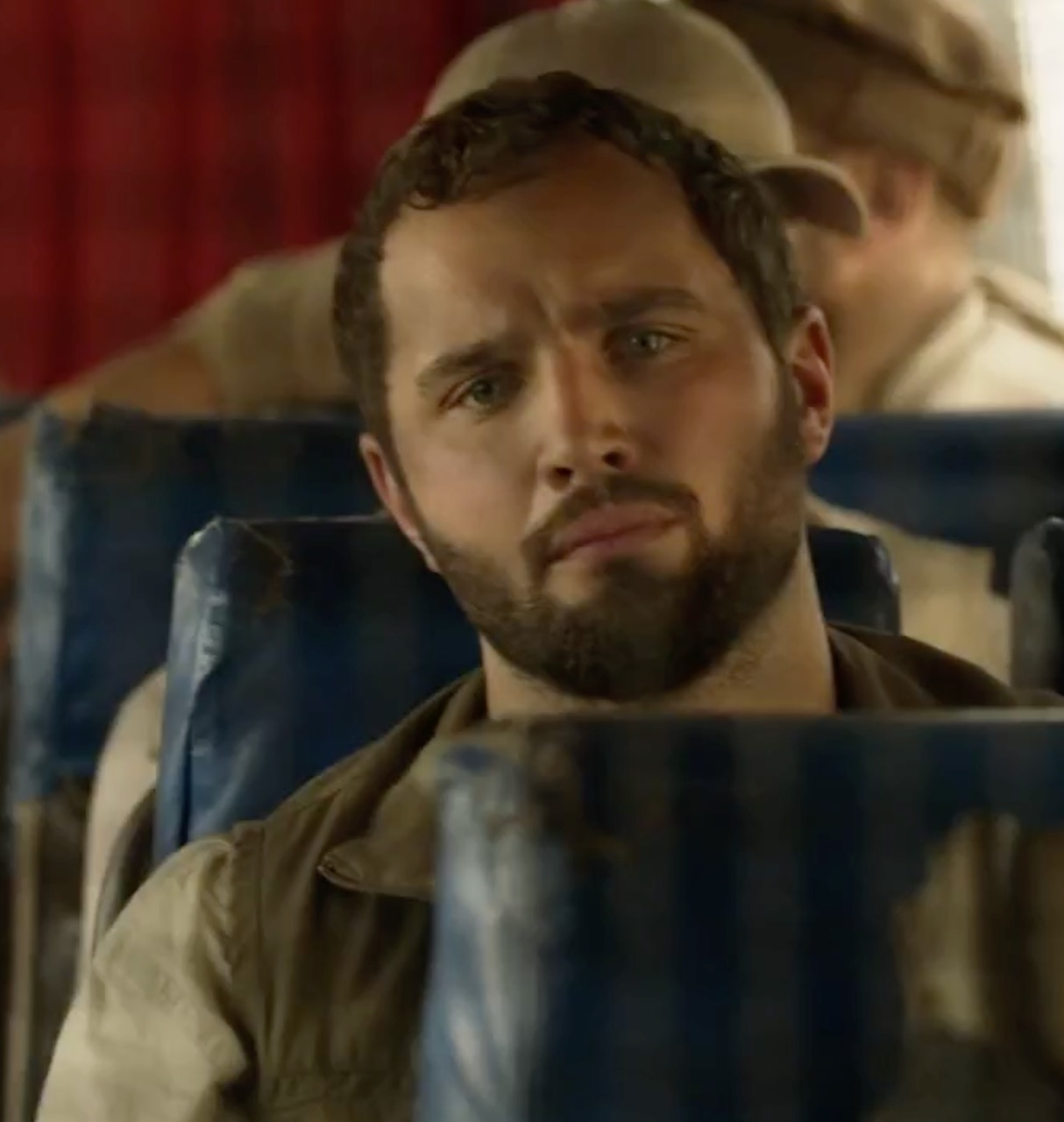
- Brockdorff in Homeland
- Born: Alexander von Brockdorff; London, England
- Occupations: Actor, film-maker, artist
- Years active: 2018–present
- Military career
- Allegiance: United Kingdom
- Branch: British Army
- Service years: 2008–2014
- Rank: Captain
- Units: QRH, 2 RIFLES
- Conflicts: Iraq, Afghanistan
- Website: www.alexbrockdorff.com

Alex Brockdorff (born Alexander von Brockdorff), is a British actor. He has appeared in a number of television dramas, including the final season of Homeland (2020), FBI: International (2021), and The Midwich Cuckoos (2022).

== Career ==
Brockdorff was an officer in the Queen's Royal Hussars, a cavalry regiment of the British Army. He commissioned from the Royal Military Academy Sandhurst in 2008. Having served on combat operations in both Iraq and Afghanistan, he left the Armed Forces to start his career as an actor, performing for some time as Alex Brock. In 2015 he joined with former military colleagues in creating Bare Arms, a company providing military support to the film and television industry. To date, he has appeared mostly in TV dramas - including BBC One's Requiem, Channel 4's Baghdad Central and the eighth and final season of Homeland.

In April 2024, Brockdorff joined the cast of Warfare, a war film written and directed by Ray Mendoza and Alex Garland.

== Filmography ==
=== Film ===
Year	Title	Role	Notes
2014	Fury	Tank Crew	(uncredited)
2023	Mission: Impossible – Dead Reckoning Part One	Osprey Agent	
2024	Jesus Crown of Thorns	James	
2025	Warfare	Mikey	
2026	Jack Ryan: Ghost War	Mark Whitaker	

=== Television ===
Year	Title	Role	Notes
2014	Our World War	Young British Officer	Episode: "War Machine"
2018	Requiem	Hunky Guy	Episode: "Matilda"
2020	Homeland	Parker	Episodes: "In Full Flight" and "Designated Driver"
2020	Baghdad Central	Evans' Man	2 episodes
2021	FBI: International	Anthony	Episode: "The Edge"
2022	The Midwich Cuckoos	John Lancaster	Episode: "Bad Things"
2023	Julius Caesar: The Making of a Dictator	Mark Antony	3 episodes

=== Music videos ===
Year	Artist	Song	Role
2015	Andy Burrows	"Watch Me Fall"	Director
2015	James Blake	"BOYDE (Retrograde Remix)"	Director
