= Lesli Linka Glatter =

American film and television director

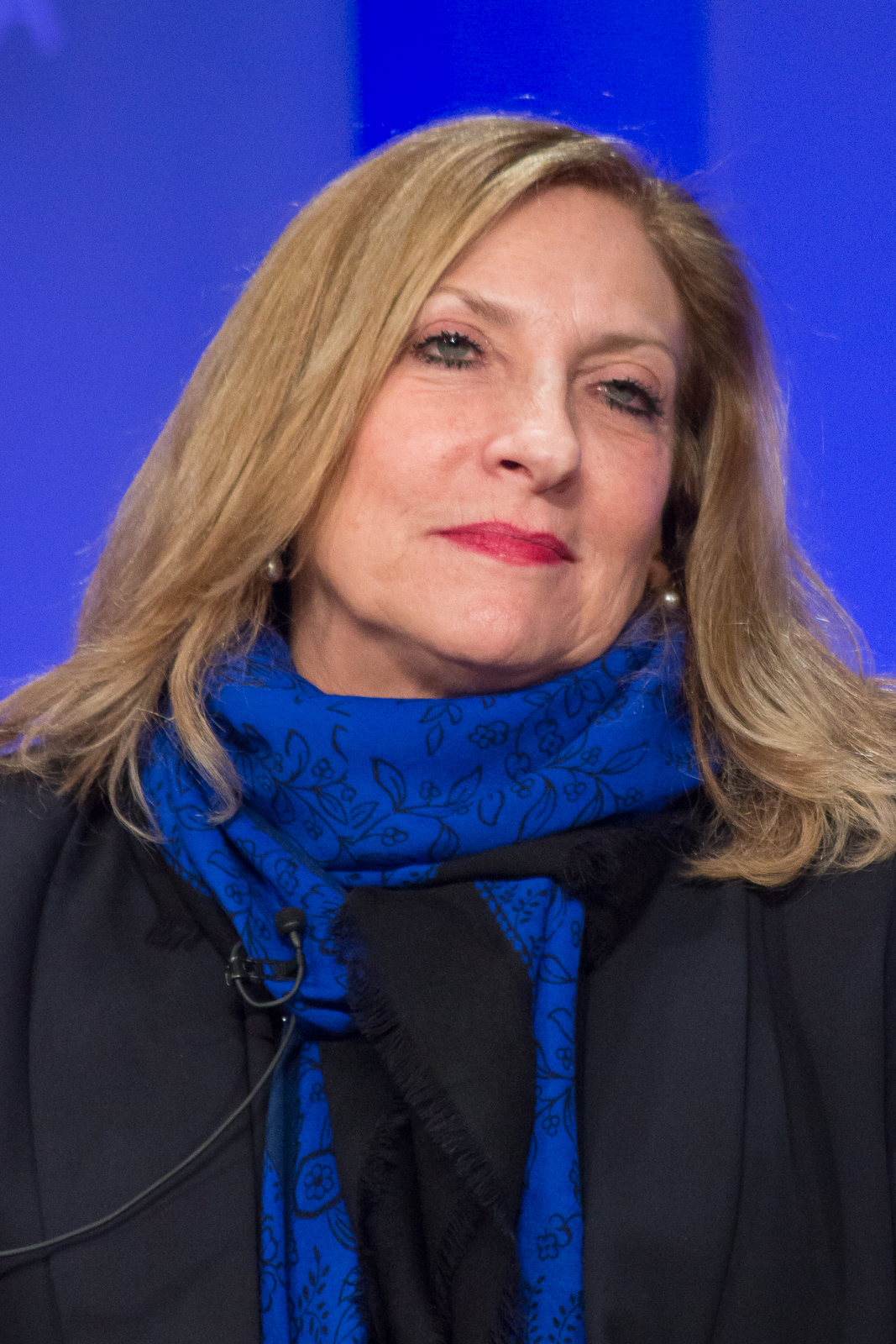
- Glatter in 2015
- Born: July 26, 1953 (age 73); Dallas, Texas, U.S.
- Occupation: Television director
- Television: Twin Peaks; Gilmore Girls; Mad Men; Homeland
- Children: 1

President of the Directors Guild of America
- In office September 18, 2021 – September 20, 2025
- Preceded by: Thomas Schlamme
- Succeeded by: Christopher Nolan

Lesli Linka Glatter (born July 26, 1953) is an American film and television director. She is best known for her work on the AMC drama series Mad Men and the Showtime series Homeland. For her work in these two shows, she has received eight Primetime Emmy Award nominations and seven Directors Guild of America Awards nominations, winning the latter three times. She has also received a nomination for the Academy Award for Best Live Action Short Film for short film Tales of Meeting and Parting (1985).

== Life and career ==
Glatter was born in Dallas and began her career as a dancer and choreographer. Her early choreography credits include William Friedkin's To Live and Die in L.A and the music video for Sheila E.'s "The Glamorous Life".

Her first film, Tales of Meeting and Parting (1984), produced by Sharon Oreck, was nominated for an Academy Award in the Live Action Short Film category. She made the film as part of the American Film Institute Directing Workshop for Women, of which she is an alumna.

In 1995, Glatter directed her first feature film, Now and Then, a coming-of-age story about four 12-year-old girls during an eventful summer in 1970.

She has made several television films for cable networks, but the majority of her work is in television series. Glatter has received six nominations for the Primetime Emmy Award for Outstanding Directing for a Drama Series, for the Mad Men episode "Guy Walks Into an Advertising Agency" (2009), and the Homeland episodes "Q&A" (2012), "From A to B and Back Again" (2014), "The Tradition of Hospitality" (2015), "America First" (2016), and "Prisoners of War" (2020).

In 2018 it was announced that Glatter would serve as chair on the advisory council for NBC's Female Forward. An annual initiative to give ten women directors the opportunity to shadow a director on one of NBC's scripted television series for up to three episodes. The experience concludes with an in-season commitment for each finalist to direct at least one episode of the series they shadow.

On February 5, 2019, it was announced that Glatter would be credited as an executive producer alongside Bruna Papandrea and Charlotte Stoudt in the Netflix thriller series Pieces of Her. More recently, she and Cheryl Bloch launched Backyard Pictures with a first look deal at Universal Television.

In September 2021, Glatter was elected president of the Directors Guild of America. She was succeeded by Christopher Nolan in September 2025.

In February 2023, she directed and executive produced Love & Death, an HBO Max limited series written by David E. Kelley and starring Elizabeth Olsen and Jesse Plemons. It premiered on April 27, 2023.

In January 2025, Glatter's house was destroyed by the Palisades Fire.

In July 2025, she was one of four female directors to be nominated for an Emmy. She was nominated for an Emmy in Outstanding directing for a limited series/TV movie for Zero Day.

== Filmography ==
=== Films ===
Year	Title	Notes
1984	Tales of Meeting and Parting	Short film
1995	Now and Then	
1998	The Proposition	

=== Television ===
Year	Title	Notes
1986–1987	Amazing Stories	
1987	Into the Homeland	Television film
1988	Vietnam War Story	
1990	Brewster Place	
1990–1991	Twin Peaks	
1992	On the Air	
1993	Black Tie Affair	
1994	State of Emergency	Television film
1994	NYPD Blue	
1994	Birdland	
1995–2008	ER	
1996	Murder One	
1998	Brooklyn South	
1998	Buddy Faro	
1999–2001	Law & Order: Special Victims Unit	
2000	Freaks and Geeks	
2000–2007	Gilmore Girls	
2001	Third Watch	
2001	Citizen Baines	
2002	Presidio Med	
2002–2006	The West Wing	
2005	The O.C.	
2005	Numb3rs	
2005	Jonny Zero	
2005	Revelations	
2005	Grey's Anatomy	
2006	The Evidence	
2006	The Closer	
2006	Studio 60 on the Sunset Strip	
2007	Heartland	
2007	Heroes	
2007	Journeyman	
2007–2010	Mad Men	
2007–2009	House M.D.	
2008	Swingtown	
2008	The Starter Wife	
2009	The Unit	
2009	Weeds	
2009	The Mentalist	
2009–2010	Lie to Me	
2010	The Good Wife	
2010–2012	Pretty Little Liars	
2010–2012	True Blood	
2011	The Chicago Code	
2011	The Playboy Club	
2012	Boss	
2012	Nashville	
2012	Last Resort	
2012–2013	The Newsroom	
2012–2020	Homeland	25 episodes
2013	The Walking Dead	
2013	Justified	
2013	Masters of Sex	
2013–2015	Ray Donovan	
2014	The Leftovers	
2017	Six	
2017	Law & Order True Crime	
2021	The Morning Show	1 episode
2023	Love & Death	5 episodes
2025	Zero Day	6 episodes

=== Music videos ===
Year	Title
2004	"Keeping Last"

== Awards and nominations ==
Organizations	Year	Category	Work	Result	Ref.
Academy Award	1984	Best Live Action Short Film	Tales of Meeting and Parting	Nominated	
Primetime Emmy Awards	2010	Outstanding Directing for a Drama Series	Mad Men (episode: "Guy Walks Into an Advertising Agency")	Nominated	
Primetime Emmy Awards	2013	Outstanding Directing for a Drama Series	Homeland (episode: "Q&A")	Nominated	
Primetime Emmy Awards	2015	Outstanding Drama Series	Homeland (season 4)	Nominated	
Primetime Emmy Awards	2015	Outstanding Directing for a Drama Series	Homeland (episode: "From A to B and Back Again")	Nominated	
Primetime Emmy Awards	2016	Outstanding Drama Series	Homeland (season 5)	Nominated	
Primetime Emmy Awards	2016	Outstanding Directing for a Drama Series	Homeland (episode: "The Tradition of Hospitality")	Nominated	
Primetime Emmy Awards	2017	Outstanding Directing for a Drama Series	Homeland (episode: "America First")	Nominated	
Primetime Emmy Awards	2020	Outstanding Directing for a Drama Series	Homeland (episode: "Prisoners of War")	Nominated	
Primetime Emmy Awards	2025	Outstanding Directing for a Limited Series or Movie	Zero Day	Nominated	
Directors Guild of America Awards	1991	Outstanding Direction in a Drama Series	Twin Peaks (episode: "Episode 5")	Nominated	
Directors Guild of America Awards	2010	Outstanding Direction in a Drama Series	Mad Men (episode: "Guy Walks Into an Advertising Agency")	Won	
Directors Guild of America Awards	2010	Outstanding Direction in a Drama Series	Homeland (episode: "Q&A")	Nominated	
Directors Guild of America Awards	2014	Outstanding Direction in a Drama Series	Homeland (episode: "The Star")	Nominated	
Directors Guild of America Awards	2015	Outstanding Direction in a Drama Series	Homeland (episode: "From A to B and Back Again")	Won	
Directors Guild of America Awards	2015	Outstanding Direction in a Drama Series	Homeland (episode: "The Tradition of Hospitality")	Nominated	
Directors Guild of America Awards	2019	Outstanding Direction in a Drama Series	Homeland (episode: "Paean to the People")	Nominated	
Directors Guild of America Awards	2021	Outstanding Direction in a Drama Series	Homeland (episode: "Prisoners of War")	Won	
