= Elya Baskin =

Latvian-American actor (born 1950)

- Илья Баскин
- Born: Ilya Zalmanovich Baskin; 11 August 1950 (age 76); Riga, Latvian SSR, Soviet Union
- Occupation: Actor
- Years active: 1971–present

Ilya Zalmanovich Baskin (Latvian: Iļja Baskins, Russian: Илья Залманович Баскин; born 11 August 1950), known professionally as Elya Baskin, is a Latvian-American character actor. He first gained attention for his role in Moscow on the Hudson (1984), as Robin Williams' character's best friend Anatoly. He is best known for playing Peter Parker's landlord, Mr. Ditkovich, in Spider-Man 2 (2004) and Spider-Man 3 (2007). He also played cosmonaut Max Brailovsky in 1984's 2010: The Year We Make Contact.

== Early life ==
Baskin was born to a Jewish family in Riga, Latvian SSR, Soviet Union, the son of Frieda and Zalman Baskin. He attended the Theatre and Variety Arts College in Moscow and won a Festival of Young Actors Award at the Moscow Comedy Theatre.

== Personal life ==
He immigrated to the United States in 1976. He is often cast as Eastern European characters.

== Filmography ==
=== Film ===
Year	Film	Role
1974	Telegram (Телеграмма)	Teacher (uncredited)
1974	Not a Word About Football (Ни слова о футболе)	Music teacher
1974	Three Days in Moscow (Три дня в Москве)	Passerby
1977	The World's Greatest Lover	Actor with Bad Breath
1979	Butch and Sundance: The Early Days	Book-keeper
1979	Being There	Karpatov
1980	Raise the Titanic	Marganin
1981	American Pop	Tuba Player
1984	Moscow on the Hudson	Anatoly Cherkasov
1984	2010	Maxim Brailovsky
1986	The Name of the Rose	Severinus
1986	Streets of Gold	Klebanov
1986	Combat High	Interpreter
1988	Vice Versa	Professor Kerschner
1988	Zits	Vladimir Timoshenko
1989	DeepStar Six	Dr. Burciaga
1989	The Slice of Life	Foreign Man
1989	Big Man on Campus	Taxi Driver (uncredited)
1989	Enemies, A Love Story	Yasha Kobik
1993	The Pickle	Russian Cab Driver
1994	Love Affair	Ship Captain
1994	New York Skyride	
1996	Spy Hard	Professor Ukrinsky
1996	Forest Warrior	Buster
1997	Austin Powers: International Man of Mystery	General Borschevsky
1997	Air Force One	Andrei Kolchak
1999	October Sky	Ike Bykovsky
1999	Running Red	Strelkin
2000	Thirteen Days	Anatoly Dobrynin
2001	Heartbreakers	Vladimir, Kremlin Waiter
2004	50 Ways to Leave Your Lover	Dr. Stepniak
2004	Spider-Man 2	Mr. Ditkovich
2005	Wheelmen	Vladimir
2005	Confessions of a Pit Fighter	Nick
2006	The Elder Son	Uncle Fedya
2006	Color of the Cross	Caiphas
2007	Spider-Man 2.1	Mr. Ditkovich
2007	Spider-Man 3	Mr. Ditkovich
2007	The Dukes	Murph
2007	Say It in Russian	Victor
2008	God's Smile or The Odessa Story	Tad, a lawyer
2009	Angels & Demons	Cardinal Petrov
2011	Transformers: Dark of the Moon	Cosmonaut Dimitri
2013	Jimmy P: Psychotherapy of a Plains Indian	Dr. Jokl
2014	The Hive	Yuri Yegorov
2015	Silent Screams	Andrei
2019	Supervized	Brian
2024	Reagan	B.E. Kertchman

=== Television ===
Year	Series	Role
1972	Big School-Break (Большая перемена)	Student
1986–1987	MacGyver	Yuri Demetri
1989	Roseanne	Foreign Man
1989–1990	True Blue	Yuri
1991	Northern Exposure	Nikolai Appolanov
1991	Quantum Leap	Major Yuri Kosenko
1993–1996	Walker, Texas Ranger	Corp. Yuri Petrovsky / Misha
1995	The Larry Sanders Show	Nicolae
1996	Ellen	Sergei
1996–1997	Mad About You	Vladimir
1999	Felicity	Bela
1999–2000	Becker	Alexi
2001	The Invisible Man	Dimitri Yevchenko
2001	Deadly Force 2 (Убойная сила-2)	Makarov
2005	The West Wing	Mr. Zubatov
2005	Alias	Dr. Josef Vlachko
2007	Criminal Minds	Arseny Lysowsky
2007	Heroes	Ivan Spector
2012–2013	Rizzoli & Isles	Dr. Vladmir Papov
2014	Castle	Sergei Vetotchkin
2016	MacGyver	Alexander Orlov
2017	Madam Secretary	Dito Pirosmani
2018	Homeland	Viktor Makarov / Russian Ambassador
2021	Chicago Med	Dr. Mischa Lenkov
2023	The Rookie: Feds	Viktar Saroka

=== Video games ===
Year	Title	Role
2001	Command & Conquer: Yuri's Revenge	Additional voices
2003	SOCOM II U.S. Navy SEALs	Additional Russia VO
2017	Prey	Yuri Andronov
2021	Call of Duty: Vanguard	Boris Petrov
2023	The Lamplighters League	Fedir Volchymorda
