= Chip Johannessen =

American television producer

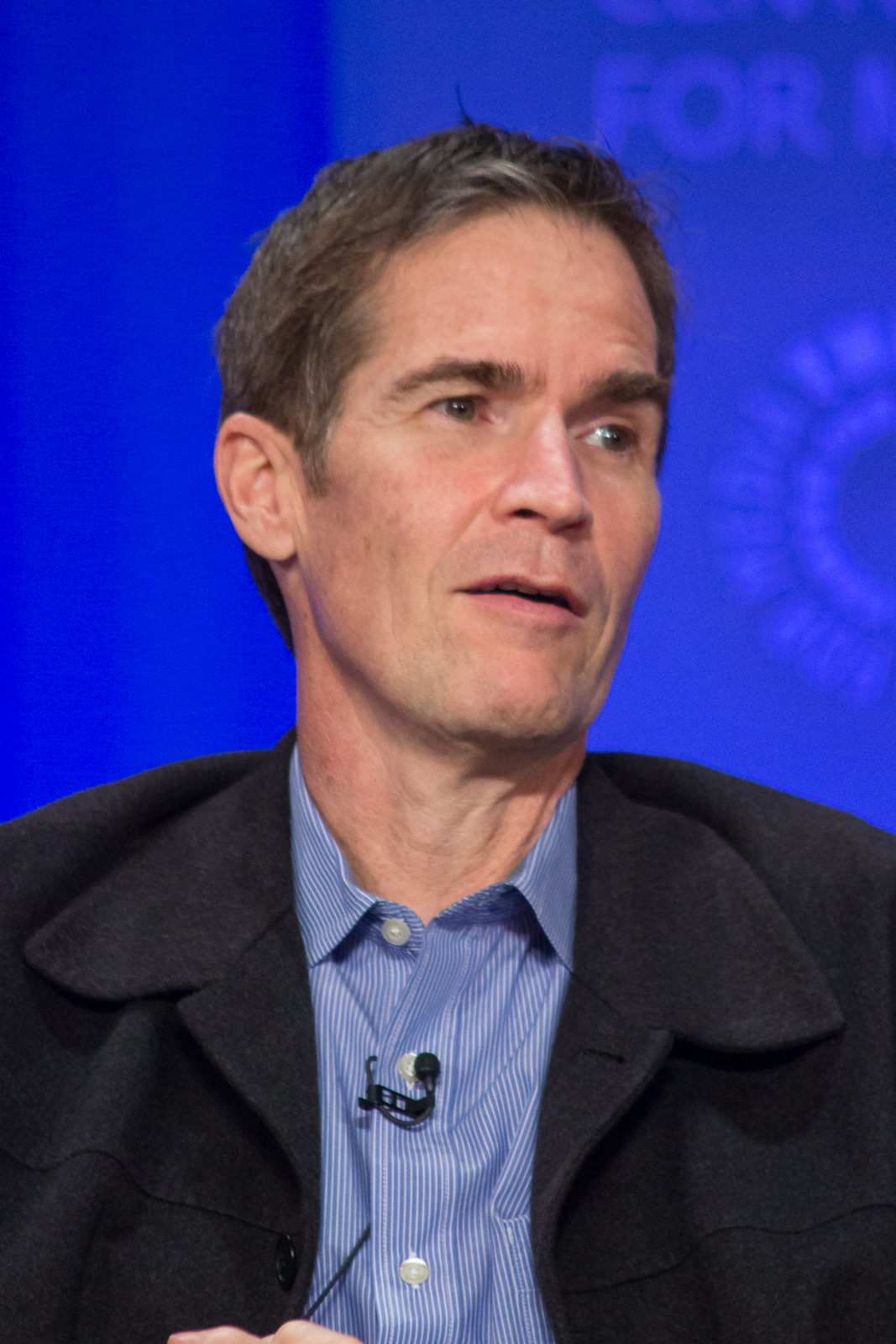
- Born: George Frederick Johannessen; November 16, 1955 (age 70); Detroit, Michigan, U.S.
- Education: Harvard University; UCLA School of Law
- Occupations: Television producer and writer
- Years active: 1986–present

George Frederick "Chip" Johannessen (born November 16, 1955) is an American writer, editor, and producer of several popular television series. He is credited with work on 24, Homeland, Dexter, Moonlight, Millennium, and Beverly Hills, 90210, among others.

== Early life and education ==
Chip Johannessen attended West Jr High School in Rochester MI where he played trombone (2nd chair) for band teacher/director Mr. Reed. He went on to attend Rochester Adams High School and then went on to attend Harvard. Johannessen graduated with honors from Harvard University, where he wrote pieces for The Harvard Lampoon. Subsequently, he earned a J.D. at the UCLA School of Law.

== Career ==
Johannessen began his television writing career with an episode of the sitcom Married... with Children in 1991. He then took a story editor position on the third season of Beverly Hills, 90210 in 1992. He was promoted to executive story editor for the fourth season in 1993. He joined the production staff as a co-producer for the fifth season in 1994. He went on to work as a producer on The Monroes in 1994.

He joined the crew of Chris Carter's series Millennium as a writer and co-producer and writer for the first season in 1996. He was promoted to producer midseason. He returned as a consulting producer for the second season in 1997. He became an executive producer for the third season in 1998. He wrote an episode of another Carter series in 2000; The X-Files.

He joined the crew of Dark Angel as a consulting producer for the first season in 2000 and continued this role for the second season in 2001. In late 2001, he wrote an episode for the first season of the action-drama series 24.

In 2005, he joined the crew of freshman science fiction series Surface as a consulting producer and writer. The series was canceled after one season.

In 2007, he joined the crew of Moonlight as an executive producer and writer. The series focused on a vampire investigator. Johannessen served as show runner for the first twelve episodes but left the crew after this. The series was also canceled after its first season.

In 2009, he returned to 24 as a consulting producer and writer for the end of the seventh season. He became a co-executive producer for the eighth season in fall 2009 and was promoted to executive producer for the series final episodes in 2010.

Johannessen replaced Clyde Phillips as executive producer and show runner for the fifth season of the Showtime drama series Dexter. He was joined on the series by 24 collaborator Manny Coto. Johannessen left the crew after the fifth season and was replaced as show runner by executive producer Scott Buck. Johannessen remained with Showtime as a producer for the new original drama series Homeland which was developed by his The X-Files and 24 colleagues Alex Gansa and Howard Gordon.

In 2019, Johannessen joined other WGA members in firing his agents as part of the Guild's stand against the ATA after the two sides were unable to come to an agreement on a new "Code of Conduct" that addressed the practice of packaging.

== Filmography ==
=== Films ===
Year	Film	Credit	Notes
1986	Last Resort	Actor	Role: Firebreather
2000	The Crow: Salvation	Written by	
2000	Ultraviolet	Written By, Produced By	Television Pilot

=== Television ===
Year	TV series	Credit	Notes
1991	Married... with Children	Writer	1 episode
1992	Rugrats	Writer	1 episode
1992-95	Beverly Hills, 90210	Writer, co-producer, story editor, executive story editor	13 episodes
1995	The Monroes	Writer, producer	1 episode
1996-99	Millennium	Writer, producer, executive producer, consulting producer	13 episodes
2000	The X-Files	Writer	1 episode
2000-02	Dark Angel	Writer, consulting producer	1 episode
2001	Cover Me	Writer, consulting producer	1 episode
2001-10	24	Writer, executive producer, consulting producer	10 episodes
2005	Empire	Writer, executive producer	2 episodes
2005-06	Surface	Writer, consulting producer	2 episodes
2007-08	Moonlight	Writer, executive producer	2 episodes
2010	Dexter	Writer, executive producer	2 episodes
2011-20	Homeland	Writer, executive producer	35 episodes
2013	24	Writer	1 episode
2015	Saints & Strangers	Writer	1 episode
2023	Accused	Writer, executive producer	2 episodes
