= Sam Trammell =

American actor (born 1969)

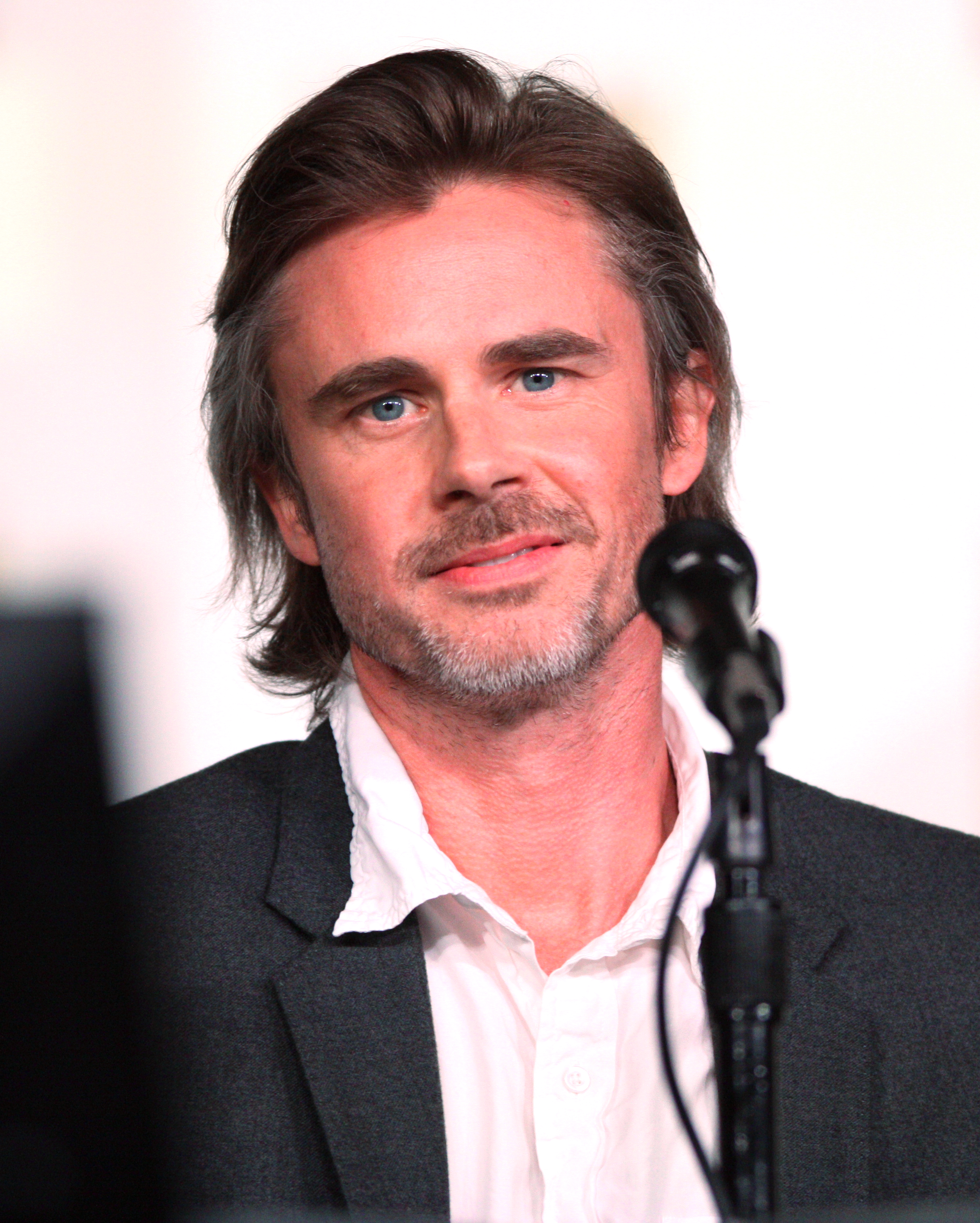
- Trammell at San Diego Comic-Con in 2012
- Born: January 29, 1969 (age 57); New Orleans, Louisiana, U.S.
- Education: Brown University
- Occupation: Actor
- Years active: 1996–present
- Partner(s): Missy Yager (2003–20??); Emmanuelle Chriqui (2020–present)
- Children: 2

Sam Trammell (born January 29, 1969) is an American actor, best known for his role as Sam Merlotte on the HBO fantasy drama series True Blood. He was nominated for the Tony Award for Best Featured Actor in a Play for his performance as Richard Miller in Ah, Wilderness!

== Early life and education ==
Trammell was born in New Orleans, Louisiana, and was raised in Charleston, West Virginia. He attended Brown University, graduating in 1991.

== Career ==
Trammell has worked in theater, Broadway, Off-Broadway, film, and television. His stage credits include a Tony Award-nominated performance in Ah, Wilderness! at Lincoln Center. Off-Broadway, he starred in Dealer's Choice, My Night with Reg, If Memory Serves, and Ancestral Voices, as well as in Kit Marlowe at the Joseph Papp Public Theater.

Trammell's big break came when he landed the role of Sam Merlotte on the HBO series True Blood. In 2013, he played Darrell Mackey in the drama film White Rabbit. He played Hazel (Shailene Woodley)'s father, Michael Lancaster, in the 2014 film The Fault in Our Stars, based on the novel of the same name by John Green.

In 2019, Trammell starred in the Netflix horror-drama series, The Order.

He played vice president Benjamin Hayes in the final season of Homeland who is sworn in as commander-in-chief after the sitting president is killed.

== Personal life ==
Trammell met actress Missy Yager in 2003 while performing theatre in New York City. The couple's twin sons were born in August 2011. The couple later parted ways at an unknown time.

He has been in a relationship with actress Emmanuelle Chriqui since 2020.

== Awards ==
For his work on HBO's True Blood, Trammell was nominated for:

- Breakout Performance – Male at the 2009 Scream Awards
- Best Supporting Actor at the 2010 Scream Awards.
- Outstanding Performance by an Ensemble in a Drama Series at the 16th Annual Screen Actors Guild Awards

== Filmography ==
Film
Year	Title	Role	Notes
1996	Childhood's End	Greg Chute	
1997	The Hotel Manor Inn	Nolan	
1998	Wrestling with Alligators	Will	
2000	Beat	Lee	
2000	Fear of Fiction	Red/Tom Hopkins	
2000	Autumn in New York	Simon	
2000	Followers	John Dietrich	
2003	Undermind	Derrick Hall/Zane Waye	
2004	The Last Full Measure	—N/a	Short film
2007	Aliens vs. Predator: Requiem	Tim O'Brien	
2008	Miracle of Phil	Taylor	Short film
2010	Children of the Spider	Alex	Short film
2010	The Inn Keeper	Jeb	Short film
2011	The Details	Chris	Uncredited
2012	Guns, Girls and Gambling	Sheriff Cowley	
2013	Crazy Kind of Love	Jeff Lucas	
2013	The privileged	Preston Westwood	
2013	White Rabbit	Darrell Mackey	
2014	After the Fall	Lee	
2014	The Fault in Our Stars	Michael Lancaster	
2014	Me	David	
2015	All Mistakes Buried	Sonny Coles	
2015	3 Generations	Matthew Walker	
2015	The Track	Scott	
2015	I Am Wrath	Detective Gibson	
2016	Imperium	Gerry Conway	
2017	Say You Will	Dean Hall	
2018	It's Time	Coach Billy Brewer	
2019	I See You	Todd	
2019	Breakthrough	Dr. Kent Sutterer	
2019	Nancy Drew and the Hidden Staircase	Carson Drew	
2021	Unsilenced	Daniel Davis	
2021	American Refugee	Winter	
2022	The Tiger Rising	Rob Horton Sr.	
2023	Big George Foreman	Reverend Virdell Stokes	
2023	Organ Trail	Logan	
2024	72 Hours		

Television
Year	Title	Role	Notes
1996	Harvest of Fire	Simon Troyer	Television film
1998	Maximum Bob	Sonny Dupree	2 episodes
1998	Trinity	Liam McCallister	3 episodes
2001–02	Going to California	Kevin "Space" Lauglin	Main role; 20 episodes
2004	House	Ethan Hartig	Episode: "Maternity"
2004	Anonymous Rex	Vincent Rubio	Television film
2005	Strong Medicine	Kiko Ellsworth	Episode: "First Response"
2005	Judging Amy	Marty Levine	3 episodes
2005	Bones	Ken Thompson	Episode: "Pilot"
2006	CSI: NY	Charles Wright	Episode: "Heroes"
2006	Numb3rs	Thomas Gill	Episode: "Hot Shot"
2006	Justice	Kevin O'Neil	Episode: "Pilot"
2006	Dexter	Matt Chambers	Episode: "Crocodile"
2007	What If God Were the Sun?	Jeff	Television film
2007	Cold Case	Porter Rawley (1981)	Episode: "Blood on the Tracks"
2008–14	True Blood	Sam Merlotte	Main role; 81 episodes
2009	Medium	Dr. Brian Seward	Episode: "Things to Do in Phoenix When You're Dead"
2009	Law & Order: Criminal Intent	Gray Vanderhoven	Episode: "Identity Crisis"
2013	Filthy Sexy Teen$	Tom Saxson	Television special
2013	Childrens Hospital	Denizen Stoop	Episode: "My Friend Falcon"
2015	Cocked	Richard Paxson	Main role
2017	Training Day	Emmet Rourke	Episode: "Blurred Lines"
2016–17	This Is Us	Ben	4 episodes
2019–20	The Order	Eric Clarke	Main role (Season 1); Guest role (Season 2)
2019	Reckoning	Leo Doyle	Main role; Mini-series (10 episodes)
2020	Homeland	VP Benjamin Hayes	Recurring role
2023	The Rookie: Feds	Neal Wizaro	Episode: "Red One"
2026	Euphoria	Ellis	3 episodes
2026	The Gray House	Jefferson Davis	Reoccurring role

Web
Year	Title	Role	Notes
2011	Paul the Male Matchmaker	Stu	Episode: "Know When You Are Too Old"
