= Carrie Mathison =

Fictional character of the American TV drama thriller Homeland

- Homeland character
- First appearance: "Pilot"; October 2, 2011
- Last appearance: "Prisoners of War"; April 26, 2020
- Created by: Alex Gansa; Howard Gordon
- Portrayed by: Claire Danes

In-universe information
- Full name: Carrie Anne Mathison
- Gender: Female
- Occupation: CIA NCS Case Officer; CIA CTC Intelligence Officer; CIA Pakistani Sub-Regional SAD Director; Kabul Chief of Station; Islamabad Chief of Station; Security Consultant, Düring Foundation
- Family: Frank Mathison (father, deceased); Ellen Mathison (mother); Maggie Mathison (sister); Tim (half-brother)
- Significant other: Nicholas Brody (ex-lover, deceased); Peter Quinn (ex-lover, deceased); Jonas Hollander (ex-boyfriend); Yevgeny Gromov (boyfriend)
- Children: Franny Mathison (daughter)
- Relatives: Ruby Mathison (niece); Josie Mathison (niece)

Carrie Anne Mathison, played by actress Claire Danes, is a fictional character and the protagonist of the American television drama/thriller series Homeland on Showtime, created by Alex Gansa and Howard Gordon. Carrie is a CIA officer who, while on assignment in Iraq, learned from a CIA asset that an American prisoner of war had been turned by al-Qaeda. After a U.S. Marine sergeant named Nicholas Brody is rescued from captivity, Carrie believes that he is the POW described to her. Carrie's investigation of Brody is complicated by her bipolar disorder and results in an obsession with her suspect.

For her performance, Danes received several major acting awards, including the Primetime Emmy Award for Outstanding Lead Actress in a Drama Series, the Golden Globe Award for Best Actress – Television Series Drama, the Screen Actors Guild Award for Outstanding Performance by a Female Actor in a Drama Series, the Satellite Award for Best Actress – Television Series Drama, and the TCA Award for Individual Achievement in Drama. She is the second actress to win all the five main TV acting awards for her performance in the Lead Drama Actress categories.

== Character biography ==
=== Background and personality ===
Carrie Anne Mathison was an Arabic language student at Princeton University, where she was recruited into the CIA by veteran officer Saul Berenson (Mandy Patinkin). Carrie developed a close working relationship with Saul, and is implied to have had a sexual relationship with CTC Director David Estes (David Harewood), her future boss, which contributed to the breakup of his marriage. In college, Carrie was diagnosed with bipolar disorder, for which she secretly began taking clozapine supplied by her older sister, Maggie (Amy Hargreaves), a psychiatrist.

As a field operative in Iraq, Carrie infiltrated a prison to meet with an imprisoned CIA asset named Hasan Ibrahim, who claimed that he had information regarding an imminent terrorist attack in the United States. Moments before his execution, Hasan told Carrie that an American prisoner of war was turned by al-Qaeda figure Abu Nazir (Navid Negahban). Carrie's unauthorized dealings with Hasan led to an international incident, causing Estes to have her reassigned to the CIA's Counterterrorism Center in Langley, Virginia.

=== Season 1 ===
Ten months after her reassignment, Carrie attends an emergency staff meeting and learns that Nicholas Brody (Damian Lewis), a U.S. Marine sergeant, has been rescued after eight years in terrorist captivity. Carrie tells Saul about Hasan's claims, and expresses concern that Brody is the POW he was describing. With the CIA having no cause to investigate Brody, Carrie conducts her own unauthorized surveillance using a one-month FISA warrant delivered by Saul. Initially, Carrie finds no evidence of Brody's involvement with terrorism.

When her FISA warrant expires, Carrie takes to making personal contact with Brody instead. She bumps into Brody at a veterans' support group, where they strike up a conversation and immediately bond over their mutual experiences in the Middle East. Brody asks Carrie to have a drink with him one night, culminating in a drunken sexual encounter in Carrie's car. The next day, he is brought to Langley for a polygraph over the apparent suicide of Afsal Hamid (Waleed Zuaiter), a detained terrorist with whom Brody had a violent confrontation. Carrie, suspicious of Brody's replies, tells the interviewer to ask if he has ever been unfaithful to his wife. Brody says "no", beating the polygraph.

Afterwards, Carrie and Brody drive to her family's secluded cabin to spend the weekend together. However, after Carrie mentions his preference for Yorkshire Gold tea, which she learnt about through surveillance, Brody realizes she has been spying on him. She forces him to admit to his conversion to Islam, his meeting with and personal affection for Nazir, and his murder of a fellow POW named Tom Walker under duress. As Brody leaves, Saul contacts Carrie and informs her that Walker (Chris Chalk) is alive and was the POW who was turned. Carrie tries to apologize to Brody, but he rebuffs her and goes back to his family.

The investigation into Walker leads Carrie and Saul to Mansour al-Zahrani (Ramsey Faragallah), a Saudi diplomat who acts as Nazir's intermediary. Carrie blackmails al-Zahrani into arranging a meeting with Walker at Farragut Square. However, the meet ends in disaster when Walker detonates a briefcase bomb carried by a double, killing al-Zahrani and three bystanders. Carrie is injured in the explosion, leading to a severe manic episode that causes her to be hospitalized. Upon learning of her affair with Brody, Estes — already under pressure by Vice President William Walden (Jamey Sheridan) to find a scapegoat for the bombing — dismisses Carrie from the CIA.

Carrie deduces the target of Walker and Nazir's upcoming attack: Walden's upcoming policy summit at the State Department. When Walker stages a sniper attack on the dignitaries, Brody, Walden, and Estes are led to an underground bunker. Carrie realizes that the shooting is a diversion from the actual attack, in which Brody will bomb the bunker with a suicide vest and kill everyone inside. Carrie appears at Brody's house and pleads with his daughter, Dana (Morgan Saylor), to contact her father and stop him from carrying out the attack. An alarmed Dana calls 911, leading the police to arrest Carrie.

Brody relents from the attack at the last minute following a sudden phone call from Dana. The following day, as Carrie is being released into Maggie's custody, Brody confronts her and tells her to leave him and his family alone. Carrie, now discredited and doubting her own sanity, asks to be taken to a hospital for electroconvulsive therapy. Saul tries to stop the procedure, but she is undeterred. When Saul mentions that Nazir's son, Issa, was killed in a drone strike, Carrie—remembering that Brody cried out Issa's name during a nightmare—ponders this connection before being given a seizure by the ECT treatment.

=== Season 2 ===
Six months later, Carrie is working as an ESL teacher and living with her sister. When one of her former CIA assets, Fatima Ali (Clara Khoury), demands to talk with Carrie, Saul and Estes persuade her to fly to Lebanon for a meeting. Fatima gives the time and location of a planned meeting between her husband and Nazir in exchange for her defection. Saul and Estes' lack of trust in Carrie's judgment cause her to briefly have another breakdown. Carrie, Saul, and Estes set up an operation to capture Nazir, but Brody—who has been elected to Congress and is observing the operation with Walden in the White House Situation Room—tips him off and allows him to escape.

Carrie, her obsession with the case renewed, ransacks Fatima's apartment and comes out with a satchel full of documents. After a pursuit by a Lebanese mob, Saul finds a hidden compartment in the satchel that contains a memory card with Brody confessing to the aborted State Department bombing. When the mission is over, however, she realizes that she will not be permitted back into the CIA, and attempts suicide by overdosing on her medication. At the last minute, she changes her mind and vomits up the pills. Moments later, Saul shows up at her door and shows her Brody's confession. The video convinces Estes to let Carrie watch Brody, and to assign a CIA analyst named Peter Quinn (Rupert Friend) to run the operation. Quinn has Carrie meet with Brody as part of a sting operation. During the meeting, Carrie intuits that he is onto her and blows her cover by confronting Brody about his treason, forcing Saul and Quinn to arrest him.

During her interrogation of Brody, Carrie catches him by surprise by admitting that she wanted him to leave his family to be with her. After Carrie systematically breaks Brody down and correctly surmises that Dana's phone call prevented the State Department bombing, he tearfully admits to his collaboration with Nazir and other al-Qaeda associates, and reveals that Nazir is planning an attack. Carrie gives Brody an ultimatum: either be exposed and sent to prison, or help the CIA in exchange for immunity. Left with no other options, Brody agrees to help the CIA.

The pressures arising from both his family's needs and his espionage work lead Brody to break off contact with al-Qaeda. Carrie takes Brody to a hotel to convince him to go back to al-Qaeda; she has sex with him while Saul and Quinn uncomfortably listen in. After Brody helps foil the attack, Carrie is captured by Nazir, who threatens to kill her unless Brody aids him in assassinating Walden. After Brody kills Walden at Nazir's instruction, Nazir releases Carrie, who leads the search of the abandoned mill where she was held. Realizing that Nazir is still hiding in the building, she leads a SWAT team inside and witnesses his death. Estes offers to reinstate Carrie and promote her to Station Chief. When Brody leaves his wife Jessica (Morena Baccarin) to be with her, Carrie finds herself torn between her career and her love for him.

She goes with Brody to a memorial service for Walden at Langley, and tells him she wants to be with him. During the service, al-Qaeda operatives plant a bomb in Brody's car and detonate it, in an attack planned by Nazir in advance of his death. The blast kills Estes, Walden's family, and numerous senior government officials. Al-Qaeda also leaks Brody's confession video, thus framing him for the attack. Believing that Brody is innocent yet knowing that no one else will, Carrie drives him over the Canada–US border and sets out to clear his name.

=== Season 3 ===
Fifty-eight days after the Langley bombing, Carrie has been reinstated to the CIA and answers questioning by the Senate Intelligence Committee. During her testimony, she states that Brody had nothing to do with the attack. Information is leaked to the public about her previous immunity deal with Brody, as well as her sexual relationship with him. Saul acknowledges Carrie's bipolar disorder when he appears before the committee. In retaliation, Carrie leaks classified information to a reporter, leading Saul to have her temporarily committed to a mental hospital. She appears before a hospital committee to ask for her release, which her father and sister attend. When they tell her to begin taking lithium again, she flies into a rage and has to be forcibly medicated and restrained. She is then formally committed.

Weeks later, lawyer Paul Franklin (Jason Butler Harner) visits Carrie in the hospital and offers to help her retaliate against the CIA, but she refuses. Franklin nevertheless secures her release and persuades her to meet with Leland Bennett (Martin Donovan), a lawyer representing the Iranian bank that financed the Langley bombing. Bennett makes a deal with Carrie: his clients will protect her from further reprisals in exchange for intelligence on the CIA's inner workings. The episode's final scene reveals that her entire ordeal is part of a secret operation she has been working on with Saul.

Jessica Brody begs Carrie to help find Dana, who has run off with her boyfriend Leo (Sam Underwood). Carrie runs a ploy to slip her surveillance and tell FBI Special Agent Hall (Billy Smith), who is assigned to the Brody family detail, to find Dana. That night, Carrie is kidnapped and brought before Majid Javadi (Shaun Toub), an Iranian intelligence operative and one of the masterminds of the Langley attack. Carrie offers Javadi the agency's protection in exchange for information on the other bombers. Javadi agrees to help them, but evades his surveillance detail to murder his ex-wife and daughter-in-law. Carrie and Quinn arrive moments later and take him into custody. Meanwhile, Carrie learns that she is pregnant.

During questioning, Javadi says that one of Nazir's men detonated the Langley bomb, and that Brody had nothing to do with it. As Carrie delivers Javadi to the airport, he tells her that Bennett knows the bomber's identity. Carrie enlists Quinn to help clear Brody's name. To track down the bomber, she tells Franklin that Leland's firm has been linked to the bombing, provoking Leland into ordering the bomber moved out of the country. She takes part in a stakeout of the bomber's hotel room and watches as Franklin approaches with a silenced pistol. Carrie insists on intervening, as she cannot prove Brody's innocence without the bomber's testimony. Black ops agent Dar Adal (F. Murray Abraham) orders her to stand down, but she ignores him and starts running toward the hotel. Quinn shoots her in the shoulder to stop her. Adal's team then drives her to the hospital.

Saul visits Carrie in the hospital and reveals the full scope of the operation: Brody will seek political asylum in Iran and assassinate the leader of the Revolutionary Guard so that Javadi can take his place. Carrie goes to see Brody, who is suffering through heroin withdrawal, and takes him to the motel where Dana is working as a maid. Brody tries to get out of the car to see her, but is subdued by the soldiers flanking him; Carrie then tells him that going through the operation is his only chance for redemption. After Brody weans off the drugs and regains his strength, Carrie takes him to see Dana, who says that she never wants to see Carrie or her father again. Carrie and Brody say goodbye as he ships out for Tehran.

Carrie watches via satellite as a United States Army Special Forces team transports Brody to the Iranian border. The team encounters Iraqi police officers who recognize Brody and open fire on them. The operation is endangered when the team's van hits a land mine, severely injuring the team leader and attracting enemy fire. Saul calls off the operation and orders Brody to turn back, but Brody refuses and runs toward the border. Carrie tells Brody that he will die on his own, but he insists that she find a way to get him back safely. Fortunately, Iranian border guards take Brody in, saving the operation.

Carrie travels to Tehran to make sure the assassination goes smoothly, and watches as Brody is taken to meet with the head of the Revolutionary Guard, General Deshan Akbari (Houshang Touzie). Brody does not get close enough to Akbari to inject him with cyanide as planned, putting the mission in jeopardy. The situation worsens when Brody starts giving interviews to Iranian television denouncing the US. Over Carrie's objections, Saul orders Brody to be killed. Carrie calls Brody to warn him, and pleads with him to come with her to safety. Brody refuses, however, and manages to enter the Revolutionary Guard headquarters and kill Akbari.

After informing Carrie of his success, Brody goes with her to a safe house 100 miles from Tehran. There, she tells him she is pregnant with his child. Saul assures her that Brody will be safely extracted, but his successor as CIA Director, Senator Andrew Lockhart (Tracy Letts), betrays their location to Javadi, who arranges their capture. Brody is convicted of treason and sentenced to death. Carrie tries desperately to secure his release, but to no avail. When she calls him in his cell, he asks her not to come to his execution. She goes anyway, however, and calls out his name as he is hanged in a public square.

Four months later, Lockhart promotes a heavily pregnant Carrie to Station Chief in Istanbul, but refuses her request to give Brody a star on the CIA Memorial Wall. Carrie accepts the job, but later tells her father and sister that she will not be taking the baby – a girl – with her to Istanbul. Her father tells her that he will take the child. Later, Carrie draws a star on the wall for Brody after a memorial ceremony for the victims of the Langley attack.

=== Season 4 ===
Carrie, now CIA Station Chief in Afghanistan, authorizes a drone strike on a Pakistani farmhouse where terrorist Haissam Haqqani (Numan Acar) is in hiding. The strike occurs while Haqqani is attending a wedding, resulting in his apparent death along with those of 40 civilians. Carrie travels to Islamabad to learn that Sandy Bachman (Corey Stoll), the Station Chief in Pakistan, had been outed. Carrie and Quinn attempt to rescue Bachman, but they are spotted by an angry mob that kills Bachman. Carrie and Quinn manage to escape. In Washington, Lockhart permanently recalls Carrie from her post in Afghanistan.

Meanwhile, Carrie is struggling with raising her infant daughter, Franny. She sees no point in being a mother with Brody dead, and interacts with the child as little as possible, often leaving her in the care of her sister Maggie. While bathing Franny, Carrie is momentarily tempted to drown her. She leaves Franny with Maggie, reasoning that her daughter is better off without her.

Carrie and Quinn meet Jordan Harris (Adam Godley), a former CIA case officer who reveals that Bachman had leaked intelligence and was protected by Lockhart. Carrie blackmails Lockhart into promoting her to Bachman's former post as the CIA's Station Chief in Pakistan. In Islamabad, Carrie attempts to turn Haqqani's nephew Aayan Ibrahim (Suraj Sharma), a Pakistani medical student whose family was killed in the drone strike, and who may hold valuable information. Quinn requests dismissal from the CIA, but Carrie convinces him to come to Islamabad when he finds evidence that Bachman's death was a setup.

Carrie learns that Haqqani is still alive, and sees him together with Aayan. Suspecting that Aayan is involved in terrorism, she sleeps with him in an attempt to recruit him as an asset. Carrie stages her own kidnapping to scare Aayan into leaving the country. She then watches via drone as he meets with Haqqani, who produces Saul, bound and gagged, from his car. Haqqani accuses Aayan of spying on him and shoots him in the head, killing him. Enraged, Carrie orders a drone strike, even though it would kill Saul, but Quinn stops her.

Meanwhile, Dennis Boyd (Mark Moses), the husband of the US ambassador to Pakistan, breaks into Carrie's apartment and photographs her medication and family photos. Boyd switches her medication with a hallucinogen. She has a delusional episode and attacks a security guard, and Inter-Services Intelligence (ISI) officers take her into custody. Lieutenant colonel Aasar Khan (Raza Jaffrey) questions her, but she hallucinates that he is Brody and breaks down crying in his arms. She receives a call from Saul, who has escaped from his captors. She helps him evade the local Taliban, and talks him out of committing suicide when they find him. Ultimately, however, she delivers him to the Taliban so they will spare his life. Later that night, she meets with Khan, who tells her that Boyd is working with the ISI. Carrie sets a trap for Boyd with his wife's help, and he is taken into custody.

Carrie oversees a prisoner exchange: Saul for five Taliban members. When Saul comes into view, however, Carrie sees a young boy behind him wearing a suicide vest. Carrie goes herself to retrieve Saul, and persuades him to let the exchange go forward and come with her. As they go back to the US Embassy, their car is hit by a rocket-propelled grenade. Marines pull Carrie and Saul from the wreckage, and take them back the embassy, which has been invaded by Haqqani's forces. The White House orders US forces out of Pakistan and relieves Carrie of her command. When Quinn kidnaps Farhad Ghazi (Tamer Burjaq), the ISI agent who kidnapped Saul, Carrie asks Lockhart to let her stay in Islamabad so she can bring him in. She finds Quinn and pleads with him to leave the country, but he refuses and escapes. She later stops him from assassinating Haqqani, and sees that Haqqani has Adal in his entourage. Meanwhile, she receives a phone call from Maggie, who tells her that their father has died. Carrie finds some solace in talking to Franny, and decides to be a better mother to her.

Quinn shows up at her father's funeral, and the two share a kiss. She also sees her estranged mother Ellen Mathison (Victoria Clark), and finds out that she has a half-brother. She confronts Adal, and learns that Quinn has accepted a mission in Syria and that Saul and Adal are negotiating with Haqqani.

=== Season 5 ===
The fifth season begins two years later. Carrie has left the CIA, and is living in Berlin with Franny and her boyfriend Jonas (Alexander Fehling). She now works as head of security for the Düring Foundation, and is tasked by her boss Otto Düring (Sebastian Koch) to prepare him for a trip to Lebanon. She meets with her former colleague Allison Carr (Miranda Otto) to assess the security situation there; Allison refuses to help unless Carrie gives her inside information on the Foundation, a request Carrie refuses. She arranges safe passage for Düring to Lebanon - where an attempt is made on his life. Carrie meets with a contact named Behruz (Mousa Kraish), who tells her that she, not Düring, was the target of the attack.

To find out who wants her dead, Carrie goes off her medication, claiming that her manic phases make her mind sharper. She and Jonas get into an argument when he finds out how many drone strikes she ordered while at the CIA, and he storms out. Soon after, he learns that Quinn kidnapped his son and then released him as a ploy to draw Carrie out. The following night, Carrie finds Quinn sneaking up on Jonas' house and shoots him in the back. Quinn was wearing body armor, however, and incapacitates her. Quinn tells her that Saul gave him an order to kill her. They stage a crime scene and take photos to fake Carrie's death, and Carrie prepares to go into hiding. Before she does, she insists on scouting the post office where Quinn gets his assignments in order to confirm whether it really was Saul who wanted her killed. After Quinn drops off his "proof" of Carrie's death in the P.O. box, a hitman arrives, targeting Quinn, and a gunfight ensues in which Quinn is wounded. Carrie leaves Quinn with Jonas, and goes to investigate. She learns that the hitman worked for the Russian Foreign Intelligence Service (SVR), and realizes that Russia wants CIA intelligence that had recently been stolen by hackers.

She meets with Saul and asks him to give her copies of the hacked documents, but he refuses. She decides to go into hiding, and asks Düring to smuggle her out of the country. Just before she is about to leave, Düring gives her the documents from Saul, who now believes her. One of the documents concerns an operation she worked on in Baghdad with Allison ten years earlier, and she finds out that Ahmed Nazari (Darwin Shaw), a former asset who had been presumed dead, is still alive. She meets with Allison, who promises to help her. Carrie then asks her asset Numan (Atheer Adal) to hack into Allison's computer to find the case files about Nazari, and discovers a screensaver photo of Nazari at Allison's favorite bar. She deduces from the picture that Allison and Nazari are romantically involved, and that Allison is the traitor.

Carrie convinces Saul to put Allison under surveillance, despite the fact that he and Allison are in a relationship. They then lead her to believe that an SVR chief has defected to the US and that he has documents revealing how the CIA had been infiltrated. Allison panics and goes to her handler, Ivan Krupin (Mark Ivanir), which allows the CIA to place her under arrest. Carrie then sees a news report showing video of Islamic State terrorists poisoning Quinn with sarin, and threatening to unleash a chemical attack on a major European city in 24 hours. Carrie traces the video to an address in Berlin, where she finds Quinn, barely alive. Quinn ultimately survives, but is left in a coma.

Carrie asks her contacts for information on an underground doctor in the area where Quinn went missing. Following a tip from former Hezbollah commander Al-Amin (George Georgiou), she tracks down one of the cell's supporters, Dr. Hussein (Mehdi Nebbou). Under threat of arrest, he brings her to an apartment belonging to Qasim (Alireza Bayram), one of the terrorists. In the apartment, Carrie finds extensive research on the Hauptbahnhof train station and heads there to investigate. She finds Qasim in the subway, and pleads with him to stop the plan to bomb the station. Qasim tries to reason with his cousin Bibi (René Ifrah), the ringleader, but Bibi kills him. Carrie then shoots and kills Bibi, neutralizing the threat. Back home, Jonas breaks up with Carrie, saying that neither he nor his son will ever be safe around her. Saul asks Carrie to rejoin the CIA, but she declines his offer. Düring essentially proposes to her, giving her a chance to co-head his Foundation. She does not answer him, and he gives her time to think about it.

Meanwhile, Quinn suffers a massive brain hemorrhage. Adal gives Carrie a letter Quinn wrote declaring his love for her. She visits him in the hospital, locks the door to his room, and removes his pulse monitor, implying a mercy killing. The episode ends with Carrie pausing before anything happens to Quinn.

=== Season 6 ===
Carrie has returned to the United States and is living in Brooklyn with Franny. She is working for a non-profit organization that provides legal aid to Muslims accused of terrorism, and serving as an informal advisor to President-Elect Elizabeth Keane (Elizabeth Marvel). She is also caring for Quinn, who emerged from the coma with neurological damage and post-traumatic stress disorder.

When her client Sekou Bah (J. Mallory Cree) is killed in and framed for a terrorist attack, Carrie begins to investigate. She goes to talk with Sekou's family, leaving Quinn to watch Franny. A group of protestors, angered by leaked reports that Carrie was Sekou's lawyer, gather outside Carrie's house; this triggers Quinn's PTSD, and he shoots one of the protestors and takes a reporter hostage. Carrie manages to talk Quinn down so he will be taken in alive. Dar Adal - the mastermind of the attack - exploits the situation by telling Children's Protective Services (CPS) that Carrie put Franny in danger, in order to drive Carrie over the edge and discredit her in Keane's eyes. The plan works: CPS put Franny in a foster home, and Carrie falls into an alcoholic despair that motivates Keane to question her judgment.

Saul raises Carrie's spirits by taking her to see Franny, and asks for her help in setting up a meeting between Keane and Majid Javadi, who claims to have evidence that Adal is manipulating her. At the meeting, however, Javadi lies that Iran is not complying with its nuclear deal with the United States. Carrie discovers that Adal is part of a conspiracy of disgruntled undercover operatives who want to undermine Keane's antiwar foreign policy. She also finds out that Javadi had been working with Adal, and that Adal is the brains behind alt-right media personality Brett O'Keefe (Jake Weber), who is peddling a false conspiracy theory that Keane's son Andrew, who died fighting in Iraq, was deserting his post when he was killed.

Adal betrays Javadi to Mossad, who want to arrest him on terrorism charges. As he is taken away, Javadi leaves evidence of Adal's treachery for Carrie, who takes it to Keane. Keane asks Carrie to testify that Adal covered up the infiltration by a Russian agent of the CIA Berlin station. Carrie is reluctant to do so, as that would ruin Saul's career, but ultimately agrees that it is the best course of action. However, she refuses to testify at the last minute, after her driver makes suspicious comments about her upcoming appointment with CPS. After she refuses, she gets an ominous phone call informing her that her upcoming supervised visit with Franny has been cancelled. She realizes that Adal is blackmailing her, and calls the CIA to tell them that Adal has "won".

Quinn informs her that he found evidence that Sekou was set up, and that Porteous Belli (C. J. Wilson), an assassin working for Adal, has been spying on her. They go to the conspirators' safe house, where Belli attacks them. Quinn kills Belli, and finds evidence that the conspirators are planning to assassinate Keane. Moments later, however, the house is destroyed by a hidden bomb, taking the evidence with it. Carrie and Quinn rush to Keane's headquarters, which has just received a bomb threat. During the evacuation, Adal calls Carrie and tells her that the bomb threat is a ruse to get Keane out of the building, where she can be assassinated, while Quinn is to be framed as the killer. Carrie stops Keane's vehicle from leaving, seconds before the decoy vehicle is destroyed. Quinn smuggles Carrie and Keane out of the building in his car and sacrifices his life to save them when a special ops team, answering to Adal, opens fire on them. Adal is arrested and Keane is inaugurated as President.

Weeks later, Keane - who has become hawkish and paranoid since the attempt on her life - asks Carrie to work for her administration. Carrie agrees, but has second thoughts when Keane orders dozens of intelligence operatives, including Saul, arrested on suspicion of being involved in the conspiracy. Carrie tries to meet with Keane to dissuade her, but Keane's Chief of Staff David Wellington (Linus Roache) has her banned from the White House.

=== Season 7 ===
A few months later, Carrie is doing covert work for the CIA, and she and Franny are living with Maggie and her family - a tense living situation, as Maggie's husband Bill (Mackenzie Astin) works for the Keane administration. Carrie sets up a meeting between Senator Sam Paley (Dylan Baker) and her old FBI contact Dante Allen (Morgan Spector), who has evidence of corruption within the administration. To escape a man she thinks is following her, Carrie changes the meeting place and asks Maggie's daughter Josie (Courtney Grosbeck) to bring her the keys. The meeting falls apart when Dante refuses to testify in court, and frays her relationship with Maggie, who is angry that Carrie put Josie in danger. The rift worsens when Maggie finds out that Carrie has stopped taking her lithium in favor of black market Seroquel.

While watching her surveillance feeds, Carrie sees an unknown woman (Sandrine Holt) going into Wellington's house. Desperate to identify her, Carrie posts a screen capture of the woman on 4chan, asking if anyone can identify her. A hacker responds to the post, and lures Carrie into downloading a file which infects her laptop with ransomware. The hard drive is encrypted with a demand for a $5,000 payment in bitcoin. The hacker then threatens to reveal Carrie's spying and raises his price to $20,000. Carrie tries to seduce the hacker by performing a striptease on her webcam, which entices the hacker to meet with her in person. At their meeting, Carrie beats the hacker with a baton, reveals that she works for the CIA, and threatens to kill him if he does not leave her alone.

Carrie learns from Dante that the woman in Wellington's house is Simone Martin (Sandrine Holt), who is in a sexual relationship with Wellington as part of a plan to get US intelligence for the Russians. She also appears to be connected to the mysterious death of Gen. Jamie MacLendon (Robert Knepper), one of the conspirators in the assassination attempt on Keane. Carrie breaks into Martin's house to gather information, but is arrested for trespassing. Dante intervenes and manages to get her out of jail. Carrie proposes to Dante a "completely illegal" plan to connect Wellington to Martin's dealings, and Dante agrees to help.

Dante, Max, and former CIA officer Thomas Anson (James D'Arcy) kidnap Martin and get her to confess her complicity in MacLendon's death, which leads to her testifying in Paley's hearings. Carrie has her doubts, however, and meets with Saul to discuss the matter; the two of them figure out that Dante is in fact a Russian agent and had orchestrated the entire affair in order to bring down Keane. Carrie seduces Dante and then drugs him so her team can surveil his apartment; they discover that Dante had been spying on Carrie as well. That night, Dante and Carrie have sex, and are interrupted by a team of Saul's agents, who take Dante into custody. Carrie and Saul have a CIA agent pose as Dante's court-appointed lawyer and non-lethally poison him, and promise to give him the antidote if he gives them the details of his plan. He tells them of a secret code that would signal GRU Operator Yevgeny Gromov (Costa Ronin) to dissolve his forces. Saul persuades Keane to broadcast the code by compromising Twitter servers and violate the privacy of US citizens by tracking who posts confirmations in response to the tweet.

Carrie goes to Maggie's house to try and reconcile, but instead learns from Bill that Maggie is meeting a lawyer to seek custody of Franny. When Dante accuses Gromov of poisoning him, he denies it and tells Dante to call Carrie and ask her if she was responsible. Dante calls Carrie, who is picking up Franny from school early. He realizes that Carrie is lying to him, but nonetheless he tells Carrie that Gromov is in the room with him; Gromov then kills him. Carrie opts to leave Franny at school in her rush to the hospital, but Franny runs after her and is almost accidentally run over by her mother in the parking lot. After learning that Dante is dead, Carrie has a psychotic break at the hospital.

As Carrie prepares for a custody hearing, Saul asks her to lead an operation in Russia to exfiltrate Martin, but she refuses. She then has Anson break into Maggie's office to get proof that she illegally medicated Carrie for years in order to undermine her custody petition. She ultimately decides not to use them, however, after Maggie helps her realize that she will never leave the CIA and thus cannot give Franny the attention she needs. She agrees to give Maggie custody of Franny, and arranges to see her every two weeks. She then accepts Saul's offer.

In Moscow, Carrie and Saul meet with GRU representatives, including Gromov, in order to distract them while Carrie's team extracts Martin. The plan fails, however, as the team is ambushed by guards and forced to retreat. Carrie salvages the mission by personally infiltrating the safe house where Martin is being kept, and persuading her that the Russians now consider her a liability and only the CIA can keep her alive. Gromov arrives to murder Simone, so Carrie tricks them by disguising herself as Martin and taking them away while the real Martin escapes.

Carrie is ultimately captured and taken into Russian custody. Gromov wants Carrie to film a confession video stating that Martin was a CIA operative and that the US orchestrated everything, while threatening to withhold her medication if she does not cooperate. Carrie refuses, and has sex with a guard after he promises to get her medication in secret. It turns out that the guard was lying, and he reveals her duplicity to Gromov, who punishes her by refusing her medication.

Seven months later, Keane resigns from the presidency, and her vice president, Ralph Warner (Beau Bridges), takes over. He and Saul negotiate Carrie's release in a prisoner exchange; after months without being medicated, however, Carrie is barely lucid and does not recognize Saul.

=== Bibliography ===
- Carrie's Run: A Homeland Novel (2013) "(Andrew Kaplan)".
- Saul's Game: A Homeland Novel (2014) "(Andrew Kaplan)".
- Homeland Revealed Hardcover (2014) "(Matt Hurwitz)" (Author), (Alex Gansa) "(Foreword)". Matt Hurwitz is a writer for the reference book The Complete X-Files: Behind the Series, the Myths and the Movies.
- Homeland: The Unofficial Guide to Season One and Two (2013) Tvcaps (Author). TVcaps is an imprint of BookCaps™ Study guide.

== Development ==
Homeland co-creators Howard Gordon and Alex Gansa initially pitched the show to networks with the Carrie Mathison character being a rather straight-laced CIA officer. Once it was not picked up and they moved on to the cable channels, they were able to experiment with more complex and flawed main characters. Carrie was given bipolar disorder and made more of an unreliable narrator. Showtime eventually secured the rights to the show and embraced the more unstable version of the character.

From the initial conception of the character, Gordon and Gansa targeted Claire Danes to play the lead role of Carrie. The pair were very impressed with her acting prowess, especially in My So-Called Life and Temple Grandin, but were skeptical as to whether she would accept a television role. Indeed, Danes was not necessarily looking to return to television, but she found the script and the character to be very compelling. In addition, the opportunity to be a part of the "renaissance" of high-quality dramas on cable television appealed to her.

To prepare for the role, Danes had to learn much about the CIA, as well as the nuances of playing someone who has bipolar disorder. Danes' personal research into the CIA touched on such topics as its internal culture, agency politics, and the implications of being a female agent. She also was granted access to CIA Headquarters in Langley, Virginia, and was able to personally consult with the female CIA officer whom the Carrie Mathison character was loosely based on.

== Reception ==
=== Reviews ===
Hank Stuever of The Washington Post in his 2011 Fall TV roundup said that Carrie Mathison was "easily this season's strongest female character". The A.V. Club's Emily VanDerWerff called Carrie "my favorite new character of this TV season", noting the way she attacks everything with reckless abandon.

In November 2011, The Atlantic named Carrie Mathison as one of the best characters on TV, calling her "the thinking man's Jack Bauer", and going on to say "We both root for Carrie's assuredness and are turned off by her brash, erratic, and occasionally reckless behavior".

In Digital Spy's list of the top 25 best TV characters of 2012, Carrie Mathison was ranked #2.

=== Awards ===
For her portrayal of Carrie Mathison in the premiere season of Homeland, Claire Danes received the Primetime Emmy Award for Outstanding Lead Actress in a Drama Series. She also won the Golden Globe Award for Best Actress – Television Series Drama, TCA Award for Individual Achievement in Drama, Critics' Choice Television Award for Best Drama Actress, and Satellite Award for Best Actress – Television Series Drama.

For the second season of Homeland, Danes repeated her wins for the Primetime Emmy Award for Outstanding Lead Actress in a Drama Series, Golden Globe Award for Best Actress – Television Series Drama and the Satellite Award for Best Actress – Television Series Drama. Additionally, she won the Screen Actors Guild Award for Outstanding Performance by a Female Actor in a Drama Series.
