= Homeland season 3 =

Season of television series

Homeland
- Season 3
- DVD cover art
- Starring: Claire Danes; Damian Lewis; Rupert Friend; Morena Baccarin; Jackson Pace; Morgan Saylor; Sarita Choudhury; Tracy Letts; F. Murray Abraham; Mandy Patinkin
- No. of episodes: 12

Release
- Original network: Showtime
- Original release: September 29 – December 15, 2013

Season chronology
- ← Previous; Season 2 Next → Season 4

The third season of the American television drama series Homeland premiered on September 29, 2013 on Showtime, and concluded on December 15, 2013, consisting of 12 episodes. The series is loosely based on the Israeli television series Hatufim (English: Prisoners of War) created by Gideon Raff and is developed for American television by Howard Gordon and Alex Gansa.

Set in the aftermath of the CIA bombing at the end of season 2, Nicholas Brody is now on the run, suspected of having delivered and activated the bomb despite both his and Carrie's protestations of his innocence. Saul Berenson is instituted as Acting Director of the CIA and establishes a grandiose plot to turn Major General Majid Javadi in order to have him influence policy for the United States in Iran.

== Cast and characters ==
=== Main ===
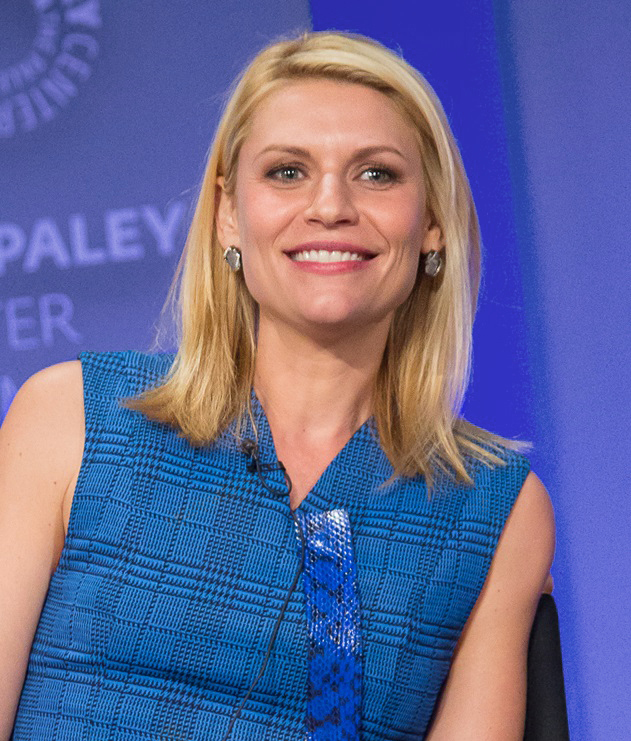
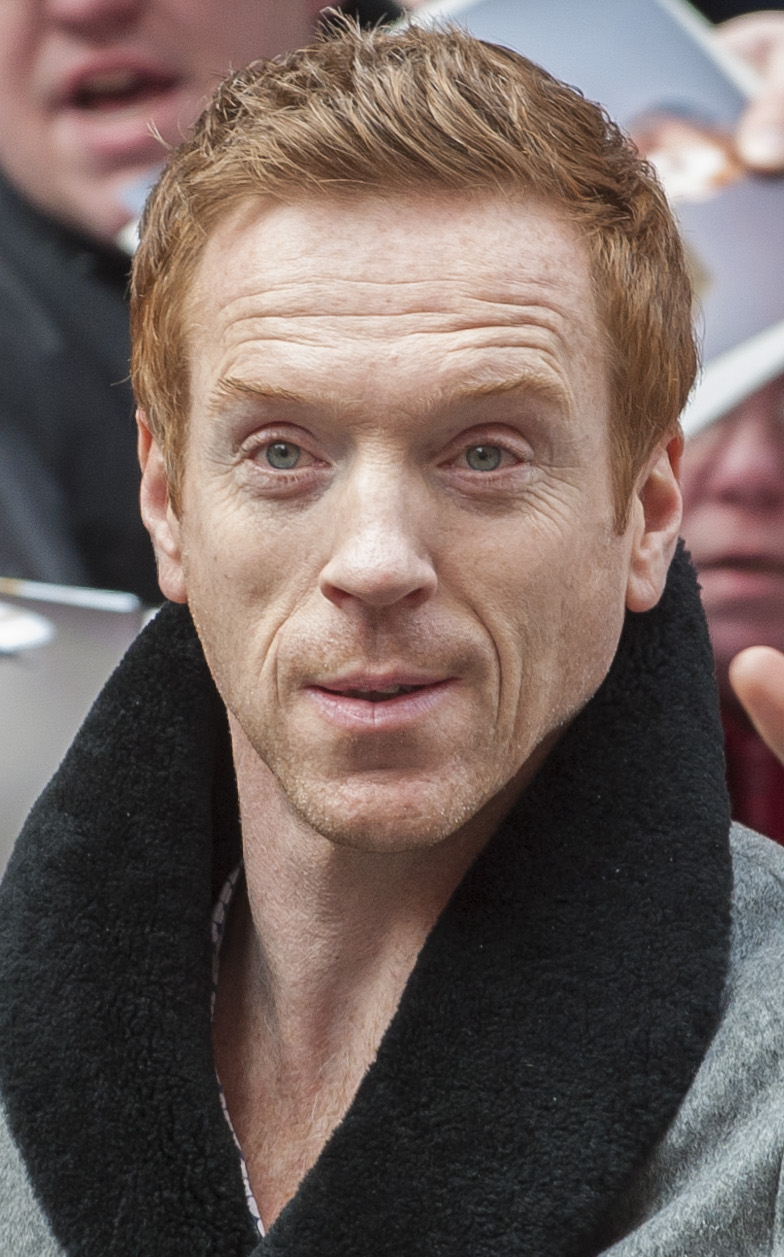
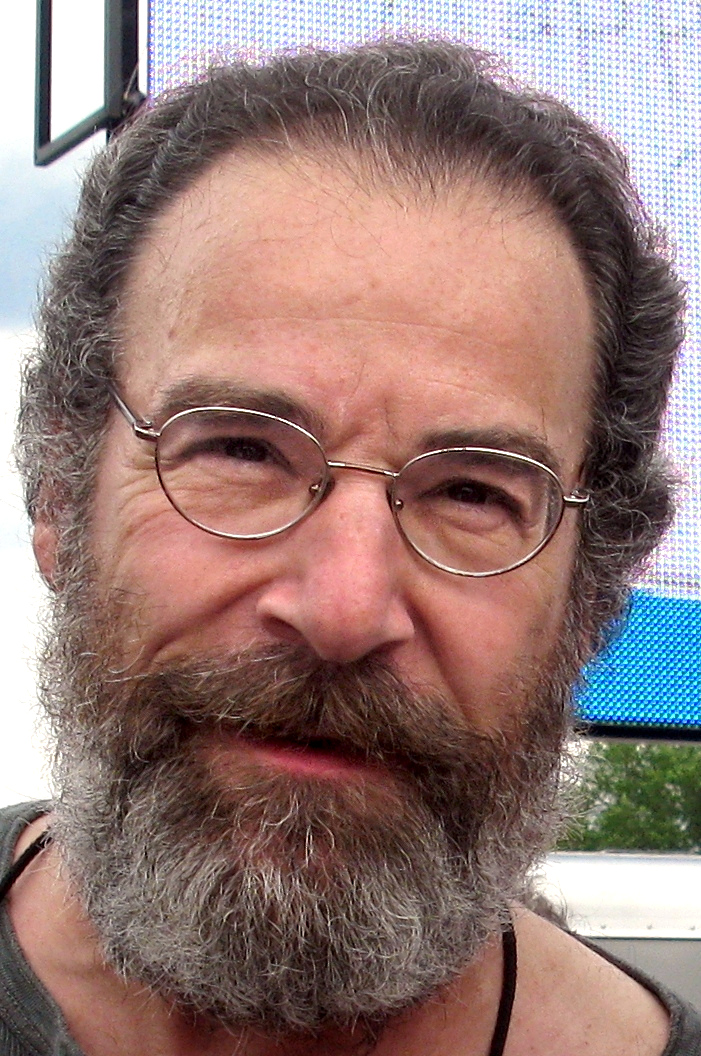
Claire Danes, Damian Lewis and Mandy Patinkin (left to right) portray lead roles Carrie Mathison, Nicholas Brody and Saul Berenson, respectively.
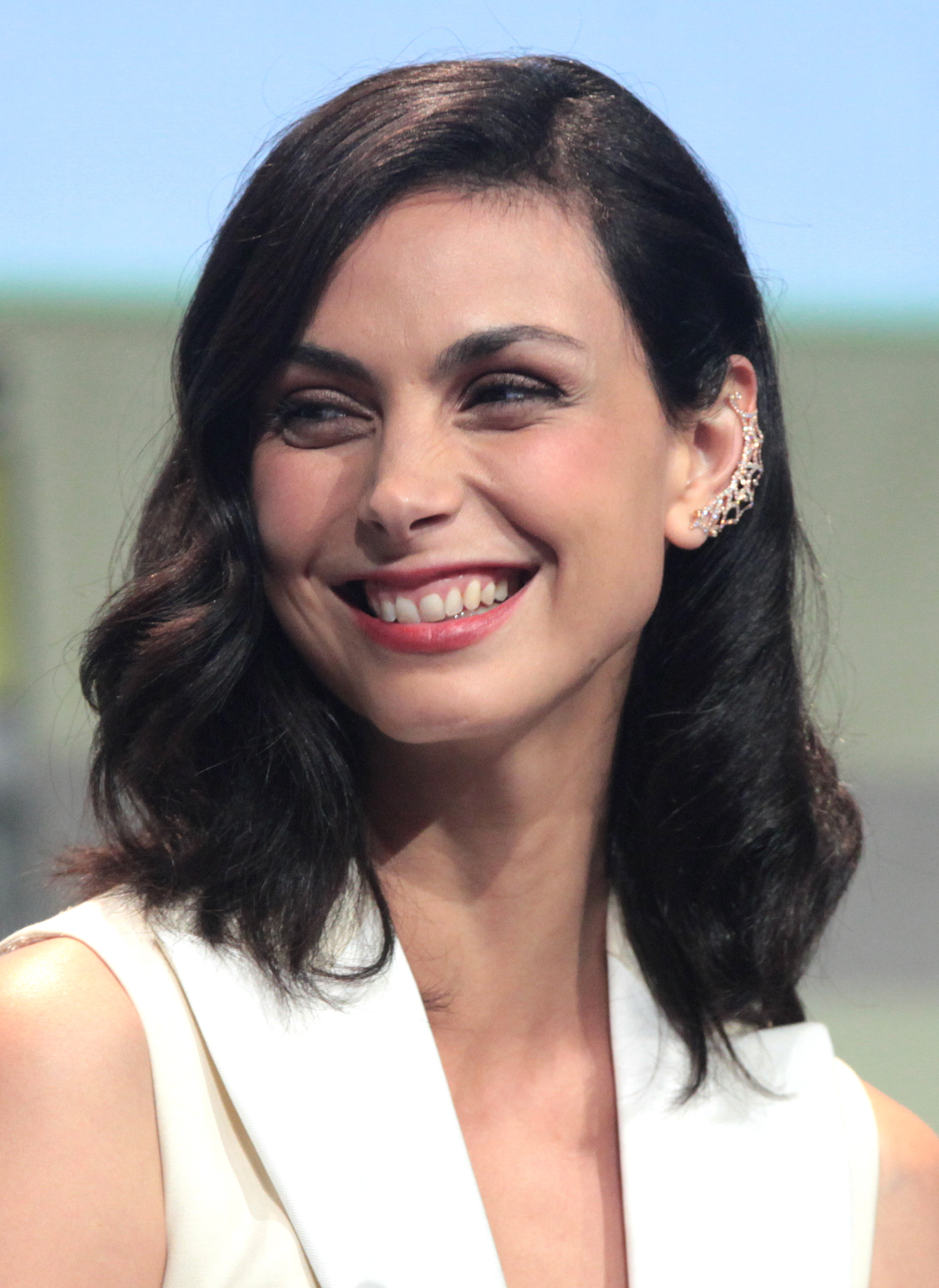
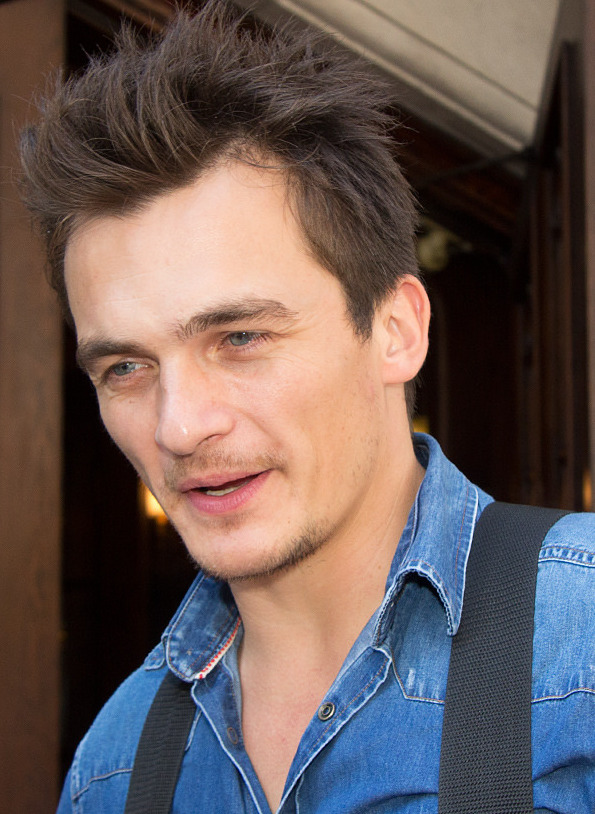
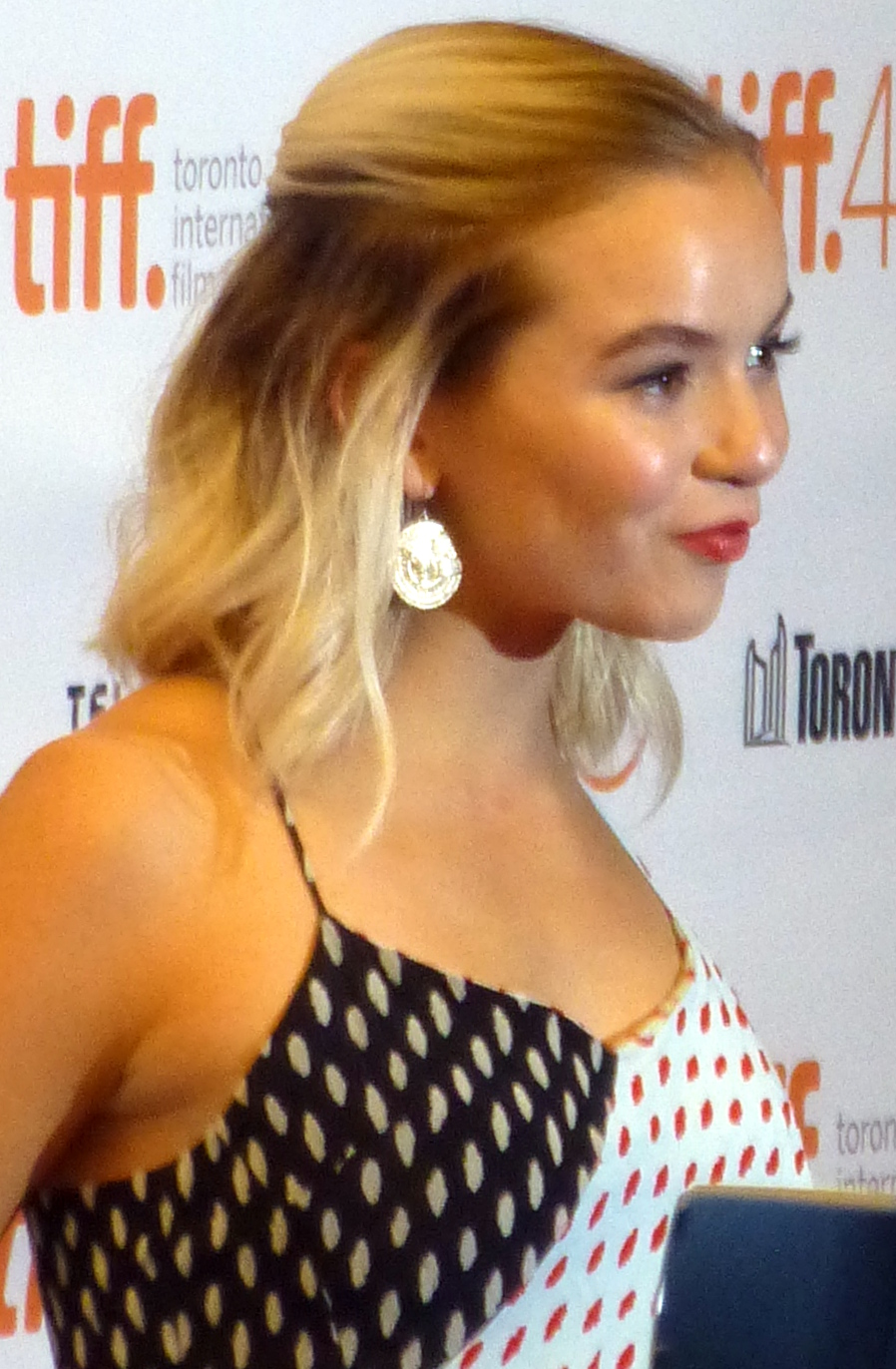
Morena Baccarin, Rupert Friend and Morgan Saylor (left to right) portray Jessica Brody, Peter Quinn and Dana Brody, respectively.
- Claire Danes as Carrie Mathison, a CIA intelligence officer assigned to the Counterterrorism Center
- Damian Lewis as Nicholas Brody, a U.S. Marine Sergeant and a Marine Scout Sniper who was rescued by Delta Force after being held by al-Qaeda as a prisoner of war for eight years
- Rupert Friend as Peter Quinn, a CIA black ops SOG/SAD operative
- Morena Baccarin as Jessica Brody, Nicholas Brody's wife
- Jackson Pace as Chris Brody, Nicholas Brody's son
- Morgan Saylor as Dana Brody, Nicholas Brody's daughter
- Sarita Choudhury as Mira Berenson, Saul's estranged wife
- Tracy Letts as Senator Andrew Lockhart, a skeptic of the CIA leading the committee investigating the Langley bombing
- F. Murray Abraham as Dar Adal, a retired black ops specialist
- Mandy Patinkin as Saul Berenson, the Acting Director of the CIA and Carrie's old boss and mentor

=== Recurring ===
- James Rebhorn as Frank Mathison, Carrie's father
- Tim Guinee as Scott Ryan, CIA special ops chief
- Sam Underwood as Leo Carras, Dana's boyfriend who she met in rehab
- Gary Wilmes as Dr. Troy Richardson, a psychiatrist helping Dana cope with recent events
- Nazanin Boniadi as Fara Sherazi, a Persian international banking analyst who joins the CIA
- Jason Butler Harner as Paul Franklin, an associate at a law firm representing clients with terrorist ties
- David Marciano as Virgil Piotrowski, Carrie's trusted surveillance expert
- Maury Sterling as Max Piotrowski, Virgil's brother
- Shaun Toub as Majid Javadi, the Iranian Deputy Intelligence Chief who financed the Langley bombing
- William Abadie as Alain Bernard, an international journalist
- William Sadler as Mike Higgins, the White House Chief of Staff

=== Special guest ===
- Navid Negahban as Abu Nazir, a high-ranking member of al-Qaeda.
- Chris Chalk as Tom Walker, a U.S. Marine who was captured along with Brody

=== Guest ===
- Amy Morton as Erin Kimball, Carrie's lawyer
- Pedro Pascal as David Portillo, a U.S. Senator
- Joanna Merlin as Lois, Chris and Dana's grandmother
- Amy Hargreaves as Maggie Mathison, Carrie's sister and a psychiatrist
- David Aaron Baker as Dr. Harlan
- Stephen Schnetzer as Dr. Maloney
- Manny Pérez as El Niño, a mercenary in Caracas with CIA ties
- Martina García as Esme, El Niño's daughter
- Erik Todd Dellums as Dr. Graham, a doctor operating in Caracas who treats Brody
- Marcia DeBonis as Abby
- Jennifer Marsala as Amanda Lambert
- Diego Klattenhoff as Mike Faber, a U.S. Marine Major (formerly Captain). He was Nicholas's best friend who, assuming Nicholas was dead, began an affair with his wife.
- Martin Donovan as Leland Bennett, a partner in a Washington, D.C. law firm
- Stephanie J. Block as Patricia Cooper, a lawyer
- Mary Apick as Fariba, Majid Javadi's ex-wife
- Billy Smith as FBI Special Agent Hall
- Clark Johnson as Detective Johnson
- Vincent Irizarry as Captain Lonza
- Chance Kelly as Mitchell Clawson
- Parviz Sayyad as Kourosh Sherazi, Fara's father
- Donnie Keshawarz as Hafez Azizi, a Marine leading Brody's mission to Iran
- Jared Ward as Yousef Turani, a Marine accompanying Brody to Iran
- Walid Amini as Josh Modarres, a Marine accompanying Brody to Iran
- Jaylen Moore as Eric Baraz, a Marine accompanying Brody to Iran
- David Diaan as Masud Sherazi, Fara's uncle
- Houshang Touzie as General Danesh Akbari, the chief of the Islamic Revolutionary Guard Corps

== Episodes ==
No. overall	No. in season	Title	Directed by	Written by	Original release date	Prod. code	U.S. viewers (millions)
25	1	"Tin Man Is Down"	Lesli Linka Glatter	Alex Gansa & Barbara Hall	September 29, 2013	3WAH01	1.88
Fifty-eight days after the bombing of the CIA headquarters, Carrie is called to testify before a congressional committee. Dana is released from a hospital following a suicide attempt. Saul's wife, Mira, is now in the U.S., having returned to stay with him after the Langley attack. The CIA coordinates six simultaneous operations across the world to kill the people responsible for planning the CIA bombing; Saul's ultimate goal is to capture Majid Javadi, the Iranian intelligence official who financed the attack, but his whereabouts are unknown. A leak emerges in the news regarding an unnamed CIA officer having a sexual relationship with Brody; Saul testifies before the Intelligence Committee, where he does not provide Carrie's name but does disclose her bipolar disorder.
26	2	"Uh... Oh... Ah..."	Lesli Linka Glatter	Chip Johannessen	October 6, 2013	3WAH02	1.83
After Saul outs Carrie as bipolar to Congress, Carrie attempts to get her side of the story to the press. However, Dar Adal intervenes and has her committed to a psychiatric institution. Dana sneaks out of her house to continue her relationship with Leo, a boy she met in therapy. Saul brings in Fara Sherazi, a young Iranian-American financial analyst, to investigate ties between HLBC bank and the Langley attack; the bank's managers are initially uncooperative but eventually turn over their records after Quinn threatens the CEO. Saul and Fara find past transactions from the Iranian government to Abu Nazir's network.
27	3	"Tower of David"	Clark Johnson	Henry Bromell & William Bromell	October 13, 2013	3WAH03	1.81
Brody resurfaces in Caracas, where he is found with two bullet wounds. He is taken to the "Tower of David", an unfinished skyscraper now serving as a slum, and treated by a group of mercenaries who are aware of his identity and have CIA contacts. Brody is forbidden from leaving the tower, but soon escapes to a nearby mosque where he attempts to seek refuge. However, the imam recognizes him and calls the police; the mercenaries intervene, killing the police officers as well as the imam and his wife. They confine Brody to a cell, where he begins developing a heroin addiction. Carrie is met by Paul Franklin, a mysterious legal associate who offers to get her released from the psych ward if she speaks with a partner at his firm. Carrie refuses, believing that the firm is trying to turn her against the CIA.
28	4	"Game On"	David Nutter	James Yoshimura & Alex Gansa	October 20, 2013	3WAH04	1.77
Dana and Leo run away together. Fara and Saul trace the money behind the Langley bombing to an Iranian cover identity belonging to Majid Javadi. Carrie is released from the psych ward, prompting Saul to freeze her bank account, impound her car, and put her under surveillance. Franklin meets her in her home, naming his firm responsible for her release. He introduces her to his client, Leland Bennett, a lawyer for a bank with ties to Iranian terrorists including those who carried out the Langley attack. Carrie tentatively agrees to give Bennett insider information about the CIA in exchange for protection against the agency's reprisals against her. She then visits Saul, where it is revealed that her entire breakdown and hospitalization were an elaborate ruse to convince Iran she could be turned, thus allowing her to infiltrate the terrorist network.
29	5	"The Yoga Play"	Clark Johnson	Patrick Harbinson	October 27, 2013	3WAH05	2.00
Saul recruits Quinn to his and Carrie's mission and places him in charge of watching over her. Dana learns from news reports on her disappearance that Leo is a suspect in his brother's death; she confronts Leo, who admits that his brother died while the two played Russian Roulette at his suggestion. Dana rebuffs Leo, turns herself in, and returns home. At a hunting retreat where Saul is expecting to be named CIA Director, he is nonplussed when Senator Andrew Lockhart, a staunch critic of the CIA's practices, is given the nomination instead. He returns home to find Mira having dinner with a former colleague. Men break into Carrie's apartment and take her to meet with Majid Javadi, who has arrived in the U.S.
30	6	"Still Positive"	Lesli Linka Glatter	Alexander Cary	November 3, 2013	3WAH06	2.00
Javadi attempts to interrogate Carrie, but she reveals her ruse and blackmails him with knowledge of his embezzlement of government funds, which would make him an enemy of the state in Iran. Javadi agrees to meet with Saul and is placed under surveillance. Carrie is revealed to be secretly pregnant. Dana adopts her mother's maiden name and moves out of the house. Saul informs Fara of his past with Javadi; the two were allies during the Iranian Revolution in 1979, but when Javadi betrayed Saul by sending four of his assets to their deaths, Saul took revenge by helping Javadi's wife and child flee to the U.S. On his way to meet Saul, Javadi takes a detour to the house belonging to his ex-wife and daughter-in-law, and brutally murders them both before allowing himself to be captured by Carrie and Quinn, who were unable to intercept him on time. Javadi is brought to a CIA safehouse, where Saul punches him in the face.
31	7	"Gerontion"	Carl Franklin	Chip Johannessen	November 10, 2013	3WAH07	1.85
Saul reveals to Javadi that he plans to send him back to Iran as a CIA asset; Javadi protests, but relents when he realizes his only alternative is to return home as a traitor. Before leaving, he confirms to Saul that Brody was not responsible for the Langley attack. The police investigate the murder scene of Javadi's ex-wife and daughter-in-law; Quinn, in no danger of prosecution, falsely confesses to the killings to protect the Javadi operation. Saul briefs Dar Adal and Senator Lockhart on his plans with Javadi; Lockhart attempts to halt the operation, wanting to prosecute Javadi in the U.S., but Saul and Dar lock him in a conference room. Carrie escorts Javadi to his plane back to Iran; before he boards, he informs her that the real Langley bomber is still at large and that Leland Bennett knows his identity.
32	8	"A Red Wheelbarrow"	Seith Mann	Alex Gansa & James Yoshimura	November 17, 2013	3WAH08	1.78
Saul tells the White House Chief of Staff that his plan is to have Javadi move up the chain of command in Iran's intelligence network in hopes of ushering regime change. Carrie, now 13 weeks pregnant, takes a sonogram. The CIA initiate a plan to flush out the Langley bomber, having Carrie feed Franklin false information that the bomber has been identified and linked to Bennett. Upon hearing this, Bennett orders Franklin to exfiltrate the bomber out of the U.S. The CIA track Franklin to his planned meeting with the bomber; Carrie realizes Franklin is about to kill the bomber and attempts to stop the operation, knowing she needs the bomber alive to clear Brody's name. Dar Adal orders her to stop; when Carrie refuses, Quinn shoots her in the arm, while Franklin kills the bomber. Saul arrives in Caracas and pays $10 million for Brody's release; he discovers a catatonic Brody surrounded by heroin needles.
33	9	"One Last Thing"	Jeffrey Reiner	Barbara Hall	November 24, 2013	3WAH09	1.94
Saul and Dar Adal oversee Brody's agonizing heroin withdrawal; Brody is given ibogaine on Dar's recommendation to speed up the process, leading to a series of violent hallucinations. Saul tells Carrie his plan to have Brody seek political asylum in Iran, enabling him to assassinate Danesh Akbari – the leader of the Iranian Revolutionary Guard – which would allow Javadi to inherit the position and advance American interests in the Middle East. Carrie visits a recovering Brody and convinces him to agree to the mission; over sixteen days, a team of special ops soldiers train Brody back to peak physical condition. Carrie takes Brody to see Dana shortly before his departure; Dana, now working as a maid at a hotel, rebuffs Brody and asks to never see him again. Brody bids farewell to Carrie and departs for Iran with his team.
34	10	"Good Night"	Keith Gordon	Alexander Cary & Charlotte Stoudt	December 1, 2013	3WAH10	2.06
Brody and his special ops team are taken to Kurdish-controlled territory near the Iran-Iraq border. During the journey that night, they are confronted by three Kurdish police officers whom they are forced to kill. En route to the border, the team's car hits a landmine, dismembering the team leader's leg and attracting the attention of the Kurdish Peshmerga forces, who open fire on the group. Saul aborts the mission and hands it over to the JSOC commander, who orders the team to withdraw, but Brody refuses and makes a run for the border with the aid of one of the team's members. The two are captured by the Iranian army. Brody requests asylum, and the Iranians take the two men to a holding cell; Javadi enters the cell and shoots Brody's companion in the head before taking Brody to Tehran.
35	11	"Big Man in Tehran"	Daniel Minahan	Chip Johannessen & Patrick Harbinson	December 8, 2013	3WAH11	2.09
Saul convinces Mossad to help them with their mission in Iran. Carrie goes to Iran posing as a Swiss tourist and uses the home of Fara's uncle as a safehouse. Javadi reports to Akbari, his superior, that Brody has propaganda value for Iran, and suggests a face-to-face. Brody is given a cyanide needle Carrie acquired from Mossad for him to use on Akbari. However, Akbari abruptly leaves their planned rendezvous and has Brody taken to the home of Abu Nazir's widow to be vetted. Over the next six days, Brody makes appearances on Iranian television denouncing the U.S.; Lockhart and Dar Adal, having lost faith in Brody, convince Saul to have him eliminated in order to protect Javadi. Carrie, realizing the plan, alerts Brody and helps him escape. Brody arranges for a personal meeting with Akbari, where he reveals his and Javadi's roles in the CIA operation, only to kill Akbari immediately afterwards. He calls Carrie and asks to be extracted from Iran.
36	12	"The Star"	Lesli Linka Glatter	Alex Gansa & Meredith Stiehm	December 15, 2013	3WAH12	2.38
Brody leaves Akbari's body in his office and escapes the building, then meets up with Carrie to go to a safehouse, where Carrie reveals that she is pregnant with his child. Saul attempts to have them extracted, but Lockhart discloses Brody's location to Javadi, whose men capture and imprison Brody. Javadi informs Carrie that Brody has been sentenced to a public hanging; Carrie calls Brody, who implores her not to attend, but Carrie goes regardless and watches helplessly as Brody dies. Four months later, Iran offers the IAEA access to its nuclear sites in exchange for the lifting of economic sanctions. Saul joins the private sector, having been fired from the CIA by Lockhart. Lockhart promotes Carrie to station chief in Istanbul. She requests that Brody be given a star at an upcoming memorial for CIA members having lost their lives on the job, but Lockhart refuses. After the ceremony, Carrie, who has by now delivered her baby, uses a marker to draw a star on the wall in Brody's memory.

== Production ==
On October 22, 2012, Homeland was renewed for a third season, consisting of 12 episodes, which premiered on September 29, 2013.

Production for the third season began in late May 2013, continuing in Charlotte, North Carolina. The series also filmed in Old San Juan, Puerto Rico, which stood in for Caracas, Venezuela. The series was also planning on returning to Israel for additional filming, but filming moved to Morocco, due to ongoing conflicts in Syria.

The third season has three previous guest actors–Rupert Friend, F. Murray Abraham and Sarita Choudhury–promoted to series regulars. Tracy Letts joined the cast playing Senator Andrew Lockhart, Chairman of Senate Select Committee on Intelligence, as a series regular. Diego Klattenhoff and David Marciano, who portray Mike Faber and Virgil, do not return as series regulars, but return in a recurring capacity.

Barbara Hall joined as co-executive producer, after Meredith Stiehm left. James Yoshimura also joined as a writer and consulting producer. Writer Henry Bromell, who died on March 18, 2013, is credited as executive producer for the whole season. Lesli Linka Glatter, who directed the season 2 episode "Q&A", and former 24 co-executive producer and writer Patrick Harbinson both joined as co-executive producer. Michael Klick, who was credited as producer in the first two seasons, was promoted to co-executive producer. Claire Danes became a producer beginning with the third season. Former series writer Meredith Stiehm rejoined the writing staff near the end of the third season, including co-writing the season finale, after departing Homeland to write for her new TV series The Bridge. Stiehm will continue with the series through the fourth season and potential fifth season as well.

== Reception ==
=== Ratings ===
In its third season, Homeland became the first series on Showtime to surpass seven million total viewers weekly. The season finale, "The Star", was the highest rated episode of the series to date, with 2.38 million viewers for the original broadcast.

=== Critical response ===
The third season received mixed reviews from critics, with many of the criticisms targeted at the second half. The first two episodes received a Metacritic score of 77 out of 100, based on 23 reviews, but reviews became more mixed as the season progressed. On Rotten Tomatoes, the season has an approval rating of 80% with an average score of 7.9 out of 10 based on 40 reviews. The website's critical consensus reads, "As the stakes get higher, Homeland remains a roller coaster ride of tension, and Claire Danes is riveting in one of the best written thrillers on television."

Tim Goodman of The Hollywood Reporter wrote that the first two episodes of the season restored his faith in the series, with the emphasis on Carrie and Saul, and that "the writing and acting in the first two episodes are exceptional." Robert Rorke of Newsday wrote that "the third-season premiere Homeland delivers a strong episode that repairs much of the damage done last season to this excellent show" and "In balancing action with character development, Homeland offers something for everyone. The performances, as usual, are excellent." Robert Bianco of USA Today praised the focus on the aftermath of the CIA bombing, and wrote "The result of that change of focus is a return that's quieter than the tone Homeland set when it left us but just as intense, and—when Danes is on screen—just as emotionally wrenching." Matthew Wolfson of Slate wrote "Showing us the long-term impact of the attack on the lives of these characters, whose deep-seated motivations and fears have gradually been revealed to us over the last two seasons, allows Homeland to transcend its tendencies toward the hyperbolic and gives us a reason to suspend our disbelief."

However, some critics had negative reviews for the season. Morven Crumlish of The Guardian found it tedious: "A half-absorbed piece of fiction will leave the characters floundering in their mid-arc torpor. With no end in sight, though, Carrie and Brody can flounder without me." Gerard O'Donovan of The Daily Telegraph agreed: "The ludicrous plot contortions of this season’s early episodes... had all been such a mess."

=== Awards and nominations ===
The season was nominated for Best Drama Series for the 2014 Writers Guild of America Awards. For the 20th Screen Actors Guild Awards, the cast was nominated for Best Drama Ensemble, Claire Danes was nominated for Best Drama Actress, and the series was nominated for Best Stunt Team. For the 66th Primetime Emmy Awards, Claire Danes was nominated for Outstanding Lead Actress in a Drama Series and Mandy Patinkin was nominated for Outstanding Supporting Actor in a Drama Series.

== Home media release ==
Homeland: The Complete Third Season was released as a widescreen region 1 four-disc DVD and three-disc Blu-ray box set in the United States and Canada on September 9, 2014. In addition to the 12 episodes, it includes deleted scenes, audio commentary for "The Star" and two featurettes—"The Tower of David: Filming in Puerto Rico 3" and "The Last Days: Filming the Season Finale". The same set was also released on September 8, 2014, in region 2 and on September 24, 2014, in region 4.

The season is also available for streaming online via Hulu, as of August 1, 2016.
