= Gerontion (Homeland) =

- Homeland episode
- Episode no.: Season 3 Episode 7
- Directed by: Carl Franklin
- Written by: Chip Johannessen
- Production code: 3WAH07
- Original air date: November 10, 2013
- Running time: 48 minutes

Guest appearances
- Clark Johnson as Detective Johnson; Nazanin Boniadi as Fara Sherazi; Shaun Toub as Majid Javadi; William Abadie as Alan Bernard; Vincent Irizarry as Captain Lonza

Episode chronology
← Previous "Still Positive"	Next → "A Red Wheelbarrow"
- Homeland season 3

"Gerontion" is the seventh episode of the third season of the American television drama series Homeland, and the 31st episode overall. It premiered on Showtime on November 10, 2013.

== Plot ==
At the safehouse, Javadi (Shaun Toub) assumes that he'll be expected to give up state secrets to the CIA. Saul (Mandy Patinkin) informs him of his broader plan: Javadi will be returned to his post in Iran, secretly acting as an asset of the CIA. Javadi balks at the idea, but Saul leaves him no choice; he will have Javadi returned to Iran regardless, either as an undercover agent or as a traitor to Iran. Fara (Nazanin Boniadi) is angered when she realizes that Javadi is being sent back to Iran, citing the irreparable damage that he did, and could continue to do, to that country. Before leaving, Javadi confirms to Saul that Brody (Damian Lewis) was not responsible for the Langley bombing.

Dar Adal (F. Murray Abraham) asks Quinn (Rupert Friend) where he has been lately, but Quinn offers no information. Adal angrily presents Quinn with a security camera photograph of Quinn at the scene where Javadi's ex-wife Fariba was killed, and tells Quinn that he is the police's main suspect. Carrie (Claire Danes) asks the police captain (Vincent Irizarry) to close the investigation in the interest of national security, but the captain insists that the man in the photo be questioned first by the detective working the case. Quinn, in no danger of being prosecuted, lies and confesses to the killings in order to protect the Javadi operation. The detective (Clark Johnson) reacts with disgust and asks Quinn whether people in his line of work ever do anything but make things worse.

Saul returns to Langley where he has been largely absent despite being acting director. Dar Adal and Senator Lockhart (Tracy Letts) are both there waiting for him and looking for answers. Saul apprises them of the entire operation—the blackmailing of Javadi into cooperating, how it was done, and who was involved. When Lockhart learns that Javadi is still in the country, he demands that his departing plane be grounded so that Javadi can be tried immediately rather than used as an asset. When Saul refuses, Lockhart demands a phone where he can call the President. Pretending to comply, Saul leads him into a conference room and locks him inside until Javadi's plane has left U.S. airspace. Afterwards, Saul and Dar Adal share a drink; Adal congratulates Saul on his successful operation.

Carrie escorts Javadi to a plane to go back to Iran, keeping up the guise in front of his entourage that Carrie is the one whose hand is being forced by Javadi. Before he boards, Javadi volunteers some information to Carrie: the man who built the bomb and moved Brody's car into place at Langley is still at large in the U.S., and that Leland Bennett, Javadi's lawyer, should know his identity. Carrie goes back to Quinn asking for his help in clearing Brody's name. Quinn seemingly agrees to help, but confesses to Carrie his total disillusionment with the CIA and his doubts that any of their actions can be ultimately justifiable.

== Production ==
The episode was directed by Carl Franklin and written by executive producer Chip Johannessen.

== Reception ==
=== Ratings ===
The episode was watched by 1.85 million viewers on its original broadcast, slightly down from the previous week's 2 million viewers.

=== Critical reception ===
IGN's Scott Collura rated the episode an 8.5 out of 10 on the strength of its "one-on-one character interactions that can be far more intense than any over-the-top action-thriller scenes".

Rebecca Nicholson of The Guardian praised the performance of Mandy Patinkin, saying he is "wonderful to watch, and he proved himself more than capable of carrying the episode."

== Title ==
The title comes from the eponymous "Gerontion" poem in which T. S. Eliot relates the opinions and impressions of an elderly man through a dramatic monologue describing Europe after World War I through the eyes of this elderly man who has lived the majority of his life in the 19th century. In a similar reflection, Saul speaks to Javadi of the lessons they have learned over their long careers struggling against one another, the acceptance of limitations, the insight they have gained.
