= The Yoga Play =

- Homeland episode
- Episode no.: Season 3 Episode 5
- Directed by: Clark Johnson
- Written by: Patrick Harbinson
- Production code: 3WAH05
- Original air date: October 27, 2013
- Running time: 47 minutes

Guest appearances
- Mary Apick as Fariba; David Marciano as Virgil; Maury Sterling as Max; Sam Underwood as Leo Carras; Shaun Toub as Majid Javadi; Billy Smith as Special Agent Hall; William Abadie as Alan Bernard; William Sadler as Mike Higgins

Episode chronology
← Previous "Game On"	Next → "Still Positive"
- Homeland season 3

"The Yoga Play" is the fifth episode of the third season of the American television drama series Homeland, and the 29th episode overall. It premiered on Showtime on October 27, 2013.

== Plot ==
Saul (Mandy Patinkin) brings Quinn into the loop on the mission with Carrie (Claire Danes), and tells him to watch over her. He tells him they think Majid Javadi, the apparent mastermind of the Langley bombing, is on his way into the country. It is also learned that Saul is being considered for the position of Director of the CIA and is expected to be told so officially at a hunting retreat.

Jessica (Morena Baccarin) begs Carrie to help her find Dana and Leo. Carrie places a call to FBI Agent Hall, who is on the Brody family detail. When he rebuffs her, she tells Max to set up the "yoga play": Carrie will go to a yoga class, where a woman who resembles her will act as a decoy so Carrie can get away from her surveillance. Carrie then runs into Quinn, who tells her that one of the two surveillance teams on her will figure out what she is doing, and she'll be killed. Undeterred, Carrie goes ahead with the plan, and confronts Hall at a coffee shop. She warns that if he doesn't find Dana, she will make sure he pays for his failure.

Dana suggests to Leo they find someplace where nobody knows them. When they stop for gas, Dana sees a news report on their disappearance and learns that Leo is suspected in his brother's death, which he told her was a suicide. When she confronts him, he finally admits that his brother's death was his fault; they had been playing a game of Russian Roulette with their father's gun, which was Leo's idea, and it went off. Dana is furious, outraged, and horrified that Leo lied to her, and flags down a police car so she can go home. She tells her mother and brother that she is fine, but breaks down in tears in her room.

At the retreat, Senator Lockhart reveals that it is he and not Saul who is going to be nominated by the president as the new CIA director. He warns Saul that he will be out of a job if he doesn't go along with his reforms. Upon learning what Carrie has done, Saul tells her that Javadi's agents made her while she was talking to Hall, and that the operation has been compromised. When Lockhart's nomination is announced, Saul offers an impromptu toast in which he makes it clear he doesn't care for the appointment. Saul returns home a day earlier than expected and finds his wife having dinner with a former colleague. He ignores her and goes upstairs.

While watching her place, Quinn calls Carrie and they talk about whether she's been made and hang up. Just then, three men break into Carrie's apartment and strip-search her to check for tracking devices. Sensing something is amiss, Quinn calls Saul, who orders him to keep his distance. Quinn moves in anyway and sees that Carrie has gone. He tells Saul, who is relieved: this means the mission is still live.

Carrie is taken, blindfolded, to a small room containing interrogation equipment. Her captors remove the blindfold, and she finds herself face to face with Javadi, who tells her: "You're in good shape. Must be all that yoga."

== Production ==
Clark Johnson directed the episode, his second directing credit of the season after "Tower of David". Co-executive producer Patrick Harbinson wrote the episode, receiving his first writing credit for the series.

== Reception ==
=== Critical response ===
Critics, while expressing positive opinions of the episode overall, continued to express frustration over the predominant role of the continuing plot between Dana and her boyfriend. Emily VanDerWerff of The A.V. Club graded the episode a "B", writing that "[t]he Dana stuff being such a bore—though at least there’s less of it—is even more of a disappointment yet again because the CIA stuff is pretty good." She called it "a bit of a bland episode with too much of a focus on a storyline that just didn’t work, but in those final moments, it finds a jolt of excitement that will hopefully carry through into next week." Scott Collura of IGN rated the episode an 8.4 out of 10, and named Saul's storyline the highlight of the episode, but called it a "filler episode that's mainly buying time until the final moments of the episode when Carrie finally comes face to face with her Iranian contact."

=== Product placement ===
The product placement of GoPro being used by the CIA as surveillance technology has met with criticism for being implausible.

=== Ratings ===
The episode was watched by 2 million viewers on its initial airing, increasing in viewership from the previous episodes of the season.
