= Big Man in Tehran =

- Homeland episode
- Episode no.: Season 3 Episode 11
- Directed by: Daniel Minahan
- Written by: Chip Johannessen; Patrick Harbinson
- Production code: 3WAH11
- Original air date: December 8, 2013
- Running time: 54 minutes

Guest appearances
- William Abadie as Alain Bernard; Shaun Toub as Majid Javadi; David Diaan as Masud Sharazi; Houshang Touzie as Danesh Akbari; Jeff Seymour as Mossad agent; Bobak Bakhtiari as Mossad agent; Naz Deravian as Nassrin Mughrabi; Eyas Younis as IRGC Interrogator

Episode chronology
← Previous "Good Night"	Next → "The Star"
- Homeland season 3

"Big Man in Tehran" is the eleventh episode of the third season of the American television drama series Homeland, and the 35th episode overall. It premiered on Showtime on December 8, 2013.

== Plot ==
Saul (Mandy Patinkin) coerces the imprisoned Alain Bernard (William Abadie) into contacting his superiors in Mossad and convincing them to deploy two operatives to Tehran to assist Brody (Damian Lewis). Carrie (Claire Danes), now in Tehran posing as a Swiss tourist, meets Fara's uncle Masud (David Diaan) who allows Carrie use of his home as a safehouse. The Mossad operatives make contact with Carrie there. They give her a cyanide needle to be delivered to Brody, which he is to use to kill Danesh Akbari while the operatives create a diversion by detonating C-4 nearby.

Brody is repeatedly questioned under the supervision of Majid Javadi (Shaun Toub). Javadi reports back to Akbari (Houshang Touzie), saying that Brody could be of great value for Iranian propaganda, but it is hard to know whether he can be trusted. Javadi suggests that Akbari assess Brody face-to-face. Javadi then organizes a rendezvous with Carrie where he acquires the cyanide needle and confirms that Akbari will likely soon be meeting with Brody. The next day, Brody is taken to an outdoor location secured by Akbari's guards. Akbari arrives there simultaneously and smiles and nods at Brody. Brody approaches him, preparing to use the needle, but before he gets close, Akbari gets back into his car and leaves. Brody is then escorted into a nearby house where Abu Nazir's widow, Nassrin (Naz Deravian), is waiting to talk to Brody and vet him on behalf of Akbari.

Six days pass. Brody has been making appearances on Iranian television denouncing the United States. Saul, Lockhart (Tracy Letts), and Dar Adal (F. Murray Abraham) have a meeting. They agree that Brody no longer has a chance of getting close to Akbari. Lockhart states that Brody did not show up for an attempted extraction out of Iran, his loyalty to the United States can no longer be trusted, and that his knowledge of the operation jeopardizes Javadi's status as an asset. With the President demanding immediate action, Lockhart implies that the only option is to assassinate Brody. Saul calls Carrie, asking why Brody refused the extraction and if Brody has reached out to her. He tells Carrie to fly back to the U.S. where they will reconvene.

Carrie, spooked by the phone call, calls Brody and tells him he may be in danger. She asks him to flee Tehran with her, but Brody declines, saying there is nowhere else for him to go. Carrie then spots the two Mossad operatives headed towards Brody and alerts him. Brody evades them and goes to Nassrin's house. He tells her someone tried to kill him, and asks her to arrange a meeting with Akbari, claiming that he has very important information about Majid Javadi. Brody is brought into Akbari's office where they speak in privacy. Brody reveals to Akbari the truth behind his presence in Iran: he was sent there to kill Akbari, so that Javadi, now a CIA asset, could take his place. Akbari thanks Brody for his loyalty and says he will take care of Javadi. Brody then bludgeons Akbari in the head with a crystal ash tray, and suffocates him while he is unconscious. Brody finds a cell phone on Akbari's desk and uses it to call Carrie, telling her, "I killed him. Get me out of here".

== Production ==
The episode was directed by Daniel Minahan and written by executive producer Chip Johannessen and co-executive producer Patrick Harbinson.

== Reception ==
=== Ratings ===
The original broadcast was watched by 2.09 million viewers, which marked a new season high to date.

=== Awards and nominations ===
This episode was named the Best Edited One Hour Series for Non-Commercial Television at the 64th American Cinema Editors Awards.
