= Good Night (Homeland) =

- Homeland episode
- Episode no.: Season 3 Episode 10
- Directed by: Keith Gordon
- Written by: Alexander Cary; Charlotte Stoudt
- Production code: 3WAH10
- Original air date: December 1, 2013
- Running time: 47 minutes

Guest appearances
- Nazanin Boniadi as Fara Sherazi; Tim Guinee as Scott Ryan; William Sadler as Mike Higgins; Shaun Toub as Majid Javadi; Donnie Keshawarz as Hafez Azizi; Jared Ward as Yousef Turani; Walid Amini as Josh Modarres; Jaylen Moore as Eric Baraz; Peter Bradbury as Bill Pfister

Episode chronology
| ← Previous "One Last Thing" | Next → "Big Man in Tehran" |
- Homeland season 3

"Good Night" is the tenth episode of the third season of the American television drama series Homeland, and the 34th episode overall. It premiered on Showtime on December 1, 2013.

== Plot ==
On the way to the command center where they will oversee the CIA mission, Quinn (Rupert Friend) tells Carrie (Claire Danes) that he looked at her medical records while she was wounded and knows she's pregnant. He suggests that for the rest of the mission, Carrie ought to sit out. Carrie angrily responds by denying that the baby is Brody's.

The special ops soldiers have brought Brody (Damian Lewis) to the Kurdish Regional Government region of Iraq, near the Iran-Iraq border, and they are waiting for nightfall. Kurdish police officers approach them and ask the ops team questions, and not believing their cover story, the officers draw their firearms. The special ops leader, Azizi (Donnie Keshawarz), says the codeword "good night", which signals the soldiers to kill the policemen. Seeing the violence, Brody becomes scared and flees, but Azizi makes him calm down.

The operation is being watched over at the White House by Dar Adal and Mike Higgins, the White House Chief of Staff. Higgins is upset by the police officers being murdered and orders that two people, Senator Lockhart and JSOC Commander Bill Pfister (Peter Bradbury), be sent to the operations room as advisers.

Azizi drives Brody to the border while the other special ops soldiers stay back. Before they get there, the truck runs over a land mine, likely one left over from the Iran-Iraq war, and it is blown in half. Both men are shaken up and Azizi loses his left leg. The special ops soldiers rush to help them. The explosion attracts the Kurdish Peshmerga, who start firing at the group.

Saul (Mandy Patinkin), believing that the intelligence mission has failed and this is now a military operation, yields command to Pfister and leaves the room. Pfister orders the team to fall back and abort, and soldiers start falling back, but Brody refuses, planning instead to dash for the border while the machine gun fire continues around him. Carrie gets on the line and asks him to give up, but he is insistent. One of the soldiers, Turani (Jared Ward), decides to hang back for a minute and help Brody by supplying covering fire. Just as Brody is about to run for it, the Iranian army appears and captures both of them. Brody announces that he is the perpetrator of the CIA bombing and is requesting asylum. The two of them are put in a holding cell.

Carrie tells Fara (Nazanin Boniadi) that they have a field agent in Iran who has lost his support system and will need to be extracted at a precise time. She asks Fara whether her uncle in Iran would be able to supply a safehouse. Fara is reluctant to put her family at risk.

Majid Javadi (Shaun Toub), now being blackmailed by the CIA, enters the cell and is ready to take Brody to Tehran. Brody asks what will happen to Turani, at which point Javadi shoots Turani in the head.

== Production ==
The episode was directed by Keith Gordon and written by executive producer Alexander Cary and Charlotte Stoudt.

== Reception ==
=== Ratings ===
The original broadcast was watched by 2.06 million viewers, which marked a season high to date.
