= The Star (Homeland) =

- Homeland episode
- Episode no.: Season 3 Episode 12
- Directed by: Lesli Linka Glatter
- Written by: Alex Gansa; Meredith Stiehm
- Production code: 3WAH12
- Original air date: December 15, 2013
- Running time: 60 minutes

Guest appearances
- Tim Guinee as Scott Ryan; Shaun Toub as Majid Javadi; David Diaan as Masud Sharazi; Houshang Touzie as Danesh Akbari; James Rebhorn as Frank Mathison; Amy Hargreaves as Maggie Mathison

Episode chronology
← Previous "Big Man in Tehran"	Next → "The Drone Queen"
- Homeland season 3

"The Star" is the twelfth and final episode of the third season of the American television drama series Homeland, and the 36th episode overall. It premiered on Showtime on December 15, 2013.

== Plot ==
Having just killed Akbari, Brody (Damian Lewis) steals Akbari's pistol and calmly walks out of the building. He is picked up by the driver who took him there. Brody forces the driver out of the car at gunpoint. He goes to meet Carrie and they drive to a safe house about a hundred miles away.

Majid Javadi (Shaun Toub) confirms that Akbari is dead but suggests that Saul (Mandy Patinkin) abandon Carrie and Brody because their capture would increase Javadi's chances of getting Akbari's job. Javadi promises that he would get Carrie out afterwards. Saul refuses and proceeds to organize an extraction involving the military and several helicopters. Dar Adal betrays him and informs Senator Lockhart, who quickly gets the president's agreement to take command of the CIA, even though his time in the job is not for another 11 hours. Lockhart calls off the extraction and gives the safe house's location to Javadi, whose troops go there, albeit with orders to leave Carrie.

At the safe house, Carrie tells Brody about her pregnancy and Brody starts to feel confident about his road ahead. Brody and Carrie leave the house when they hear their rescue helicopter, not knowing it is false sound being generated by a loudspeaker. Brody is immediately seized by Iranian military forces and Carrie screams as she is left behind.

Brody is given a speedy trial and sentenced to be hanged publicly. Carrie attends, pushing her way through the crowd to reach the chain link fence surrounding the execution zone, having mourned that entire day. She looks on, devastated, then climbs the fence and calls his name loudly so Brody knows she is there as he dies.

Four months pass. Iran offers the IAEA full access to its nuclear sites in exchange for the lifting of economic sanctions. Carrie has chosen not to have an abortion because she "wanted a part" of Brody, who is the father. She tells Quinn that she is afraid of motherhood; however, he encourages her to keep the baby. Lockhart has a meeting with Carrie where he promotes her to station chief in Istanbul. Not only is Istanbul the most prestigious station, Carrie has become the youngest station chief in CIA history. Carrie asks whether, at the upcoming CIA memorial, Brody might be given a star alongside the fallen agents, but Lockhart refuses because Brody was not a CIA employee and the director does not believe that an erstwhile would-be terrorist merits such an honor. Meeting later her sister and father, Carrie tells them she plans to give the baby up but her father offers to adopt the child.

Saul was fired after Lockhart took office and went to work in the private sector, paid much more money. He gets an invitation to attend the upcoming CIA memorial. He speaks with Dar Adal and Carrie after seeing them again, and conveys he still prefers the CIA over private industry. Later that night, hours after the memorial, Carrie walks through the CIA's halls, approaches the memorial wall, and furtively draws a star in memory of Brody with a marker pen.

== Production ==
Former series writer Meredith Stiehm rejoined the writing staff to co-write the season finale with showrunner Alex Gansa. The episode was directed by co-executive producer Lesli Linka Glatter. Brody's execution scene was filmed on the final day of shooting for season three. It was shot overnight on location in Rabat, Morocco and had 400 extras playing the Iranian mob.

A complete version of the season's finale was leaked on December 13, 2013, almost 48 hours prior to its scheduled air date and became available on numerous internet file sharing platforms.

== Reception ==
=== Ratings ===
The episode received a series-high 2.4 million viewers on its original broadcast and cumulative rating of 2.9 million over the two airings that night.

=== Critical response ===
The episode received very positive reviews. Scott Collura of IGN gave the season finale a score of 9.4 out of 10, and praised the performances of Claire Danes and Damian Lewis and the writers' decision to kill off the character of Nicholas Brody. Collura wrote, "The Star is perhaps one of the saddest hours of TV we've seen in some time, and it's also a reminder that for all the Carrie fatigue that's been going around this season, Claire Danes remains an amazing performer." Although he felt the wrap-up was "clunky", he continued, "but that doesn't really matter. Because when Carrie quietly scrawls that star for Brody on the wall, a star that no one will recognize except her and maybe a few other people, we couldn't ask for a better memorial to the character."

Emily VanDerWerff and Sonia Saraiya reviewed the episode for The A.V. Club. VanDerWerff graded the episode an "A−" and commented that "The Star" was the strongest episode of the third season. She wrote, "Above all, it did the main thing a season finale should do: It made me interested to see what season four looks like. I don't know if I would have said that before watching “The Star,” and that I feel that way after watching it is the highest compliment I could pay it." Saraiya gave it a perfect "A" grade and wrote, "I loved this episode. I literally cried at the end." She also wrote that the episode works on an emotional level, writing that the finale "hit me in the gut, with an echo of that same emotional wrenching that characterized some of the show's strongest episodes from its first two seasons for me."
