= Still Positive =

- Homeland episode
- Episode no.: Season 3 Episode 6
- Directed by: Lesli Linka Glatter
- Written by: Alexander Cary
- Production code: 3WAH06
- Original air date: November 3, 2013
- Running time: 49 minutes

Guest appearances
- Mary Apick as Fariba; Maury Sterling as Max; Nazanin Boniadi as Fara Sherazi; Shaun Toub as Majid Javadi

Episode chronology
| ← Previous "The Yoga Play" | Next → "Gerontion" |
- Homeland season 3

"Still Positive" is the sixth episode of the third season of the American television drama series Homeland, and the 30th episode overall. It premiered on Showtime on November 3, 2013.

== Plot ==
Majid Javadi (Shaun Toub) hooks Carrie (Claire Danes) up to a polygraph and begins asking her questions. Javadi can see that Carrie is lying. Carrie quickly drops the pretence and reveals that her having been disgraced by the CIA was part of a plan to lure Javadi into their clutches. She adds that they're aware of Javadi's embezzling of government funds and can make him an enemy of the state in Iran. When Javadi asks why he hasn't been arrested yet, Carrie says that Saul wants to speak with him first. They agree to a meeting at a coffee shop later that day. Max (Maury Sterling), at a CIA safehouse, tracks Javadi's whereabouts via remote aerial surveillance. Upon returning home, Carrie checks in with Saul and informs him of the planned meet. Carrie then takes a pregnancy test, which comes up positive.

Saul (Mandy Patinkin) informs Fara (Nazanin Boniadi) of his background with Javadi: at the time of the Iranian revolution in 1979, Saul and Javadi had been allies. Saul asked Javadi for help getting four of his informants out of the country. Instead, they were all assassinated when Javadi served them up to the new regime in order to secure a position in their intelligence ranks. Months later, as a bit of revenge, Saul helped Javadi's wife and child flee to the United States.

Dana (Morgan Saylor) has changed her last name to her mother's maiden name, "Lazaro," as a continuation of her efforts to leave behind her troubled life as "Dana Brody". Jessica (Morena Baccarin), Dana's mother, becomes intrigued by this idea. Angela, a friend of Dana's, arrives at the Brody house to pick her up. The reality of her association with the apparent Langley bomber has proven too much to bear, and Dana abruptly announces to her mother that she is moving out of the house. Dana does leave home despite protests from an at first incredulous Jessica, who then realizes why her daughter is leaving her.

Instead of going to the meeting, Javadi heads to a house which is being rented to his daughter-in-law Susan. When Saul realizes where Javadi is going, he immediately sends Carrie and Quinn there to intercept him. Javadi forces his way into the house, shoots Susan, and brutally murders his ex-wife Fariba (Mary Apick) with a broken bottle. Saul wonders why Fariba was there when she was supposed to be under witness protection in California. Carrie and Quinn arrive, capturing Javadi and retrieving the murder weapons. Susan's two-year-old child is also in the house, but Saul rebuffs Carrie's desire to take the child with them. The CIA is unable to clean up the murder scene before local homicide detectives arrive.

After Carrie and Quinn deliver a blood-stained Javadi to the CIA safehouse, Saul strikes Javadi in the face, knocking him to the ground.

== Production ==
The episode was written by executive producer Alexander Cary. It was directed by co-executive producer Lesli Linka Glatter.

== Reception ==
=== Ratings ===
The initial airing of this episode was watched by 2 million viewers. Factoring in the replay, the cumulative viewership was 2.75 million, setting a series high to date.

=== Critical reception ===
Emily VanDerWerff of The A.V. Club gave the episode a "B+" grade, citing the continued deeper exploration of Saul Berenson's character as one of the show's strengths.
