= A Red Wheelbarrow =

- Homeland episode
- Episode no.: Season 3 Episode 8
- Directed by: Seith Mann
- Written by: Alex Gansa; James Yoshimura
- Production code: 3WAH08
- Original air date: November 17, 2013
- Running time: 46 minutes

Guest appearances
- Chance Kelly as Mitchell Clausen; Tim Guinee as Scott Ryan; William Abadie as Alain Bernard; Nazanin Boniadi as Fara Sherazi; Martin Donovan as Leland Bennett; Jason Butler Harner as Paul Franklin; William Sadler as Mike Higgins; Parviz Sayyad as Fara's father; Manny Pérez as El Niño; Cindy Cheung as doctor; Lisa Tharps as Roxanne

Episode chronology
← Previous "Gerontion"	Next → "One Last Thing"
- Homeland season 3

"A Red Wheelbarrow" is the eighth episode of the third season of the American television drama series Homeland, and the 32nd episode overall. It premiered on Showtime on November 17, 2013.

== Plot ==
Saul (Mandy Patinkin) briefs White House Chief of Staff Mike Higgins (William Sadler) on the next phase of his operation: a "regime change" in which the CIA will attempt to move Majid Javadi further up the chain of command in Iran. Dar Adal (F. Murray Abraham) alludes to a trip that Saul will be taking imminently; Saul tells him that Carrie can't know anything about it. Mira (Sarita Choudhury) tells her boyfriend Alain (William Abadie) that she wants to cut things off with him to try to repair her marriage with Saul. Alain is later seen at the Berensons' house planting a bug on Saul's computer.

Carrie (Claire Danes), now thirteen weeks pregnant, sees a doctor for the first time and gets a sonogram. Carrie admits to heavy drinking during the pregnancy along with her lithium usage. The doctor (Cindy Cheung) tells Carrie she has very high blood pressure and that she will need to curb her intense work habits or risk the health of the baby. Carrie responds that what she's working on is directly connected with the baby's father---that she needs to "make things right".

Based on what Javadi told Carrie, the CIA initiates a plan to flush out the man who built the bomb that was used to attack Langley. Dar Adal tells Leland Bennett (Martin Donovan) that the CIA is about to open an investigation into his dealings, advising him to cooperate fully. Leland declines the offer. As anticipated, this leads to Bennett's associate, Paul Franklin (Jason Butler Harner), contacting Carrie, asking her to find out why the CIA is investigating Bennett. Carrie later comes back to him with the false information that the CIA has a warrant out for the Langley bomber and has linked the bomber to Bennett. Franklin relays this to Bennett, who gives the order to exfiltrate the bomber out of the country as soon as possible. Via wiretap, the CIA hears this plan and also obtains the address where Franklin is meeting the bomber. When the time comes, the CIA stakes out the location (a motel). Carrie, observing from a distance, sees Franklin applying a silencer to a handgun before he exits his car. Carrie starts to approach Franklin, exclaiming that Saul promised to capture the bomber alive, and that the bomber is the only person who can prove Brody's innocence. Dar Adal orders her to stop immediately, stressing that her intervention would expose them to Bennett and ruin the entire Javadi operation as well. Carrie still does not stand down. Quinn, armed with a sniper rifle, shoots Carrie in the arm. Franklin enters the motel room and immediately kills the bomber. Carrie is rushed to the hospital. She is furious to learn that the bomber is dead and demands to know where Saul is.

Saul arrives at his destination, the Tower of David in Caracas. He presents El Niño (Manny Pérez) with $10 million in cash and is escorted to the cell where Brody (Damian Lewis) is being kept. Saul finds Brody in a catatonic state, surrounded by used needles.

== Production ==
The episode was written by showrunner Alex Gansa and consulting producer James Yoshimura. It was directed by Seith Mann.

== Reception ==
=== Ratings ===
The original broadcast was watched by 1.78 million viewers, a decrease of 70,000 from the previous week.

== Title ==
The title reflects a brief SMS exchange between Carrie and a restricted correspondent shortly after Dar Adal and Leland Bennett meeting, in which the first two verses of the William Carlos Williams' poem "The Red Wheelbarrow" are used:

So much depends
upon

A red wheel
barrow

Glazed with
rainwater

Beside the white
chickens
