= Game On (Homeland) =

- Homeland episode
- Episode no.: Season 3 Episode 4
- Directed by: David Nutter
- Written by: James Yoshimura; Alex Gansa
- Production code: 3WAH04
- Original air date: October 20, 2013
- Running time: 49 minutes

Guest appearances
- Diego Klattenhoff as Mike Faber; David Marciano as Virgil; James Rebhorn as Frank Mathison; Jason Butler Harner as Paul Franklin; Martin Donovan as Leland Bennett; Nazanin Boniadi as Fara Sherazi; Sam Underwood as Leo Carras; Marcia DeBonis as Abby; Stephanie J. Block as lawyer; David Fonteno as Robert Strauss; Stephen Schnetzer as Dr. Maloney; Jennifer Marsala as Amanda Lambert; Gary Wilmes as Dr. Troy Richardson

Episode chronology
← Previous "Tower of David"	Next → "The Yoga Play"
- Homeland season 3

"Game On" is the fourth episode of the third season of the American television drama series Homeland, and the 28th episode overall. It premiered on Showtime on October 20, 2013.

== Plot ==
Dana (Morgan Saylor) helps Leo Carras (Sam Underwood) escape from the hospital, and they go on the run together in Jessica's (Morena Baccarin) car. They go to Leo's brother's grave, and their conversation reveals that his brother committed suicide. Dana then takes him to the base where her father was stationed, and says that the day he said goodbye to her before being deployed to Iraq was the last time he was honest with her. Jessica and Mike (Diego Klattenhoff), whom she is now dating, meet Leo's parents, who call Dana "a bad influence" and say they know who her father is, but Jessica tells Mr. and Mrs. Carras that Dana is not responsible for her father's actions. Mike starts investigating Leo, and finds out that he was sent to the hospital as part of a plea agreement — the police believe that he was responsible for his brother's death.

Fara (Nazanin Boniadi) traces the money behind the Langley bombings to an Iranian star soccer player who died years before. Saul (Mandy Patinkin) theorizes that the true culprit is using a fake identity.

Carrie (Claire Danes) attends a competency hearing, with apparently good chances of being released from the psychiatric hospital. Her release is denied, however, because of a directive from the U.S. Department of Justice labeling her a security risk. She calls her father and tells him to tell Saul that she will do anything he asks if he has her released. Shortly after, it is revealed that a Washington appellate judge granted Carrie's release, which prompts Saul to freeze her bank account, impound her car and put her under surveillance. When Carrie returns home, Franklin (Jason Butler Harner) is there waiting for her, and asks her one more time to meet his client. She refuses at first, but after Franklin reveals that it was his firm that facilitated her release along with a promise to keep her out of the hospital permanently, she agrees. She meets the client, Leland Bennett (Martin Donovan), a lawyer for a bank with ties to Iranian terrorists, including the masterminds of the Langley bombing. Bennett asks her to give them information about the CIA in return for their protection against the agency's reprisals against her; he says that the agency will destroy her, one way or another, unless she accepts the deal. Carrie does so, but refuses to name any agents in the field.

That night, Carrie goes to Saul's house, and it is revealed that her entire hospitalization ordeal has been part of an elaborate, secret operation to infiltrate the Iranian terrorist group behind the bombing.

== Production ==
David Nutter directed the episode. Co-creator Alex Gansa and consulting producer James Yoshimura wrote the episode; it is Yoshimura's first writing credit of the series. The episode guest stars former series regulars Diego Klattenhoff and David Marciano, who were both downgraded from main cast status after the conclusion of the second season.

== Reception ==
=== Critical response ===
Critical analysis centered mostly on the pivotal plot twist at the end of the episode. Some critics reacted negatively. TV.com's Tim Surette criticized the twist at length, saying the subterfuge was kept up for too long, and that "the reveal wasn't anywhere near worth all the frustration of the beginning of the season". Time's James Poniewozik disliked the twist as well, saying it was done "in a way that subordinated what we know of the central characters to the needs of pulling off a shocker".

Other critics thought the twist elevated the prospects of the season. Rolling Stone's Sean T. Collins called it a "resounding success" and that the twist raises new and interesting questions in addition to the answers it provides. Emily VanDerWerff of The A.V. Club gave the episode a "B" grade overall, stating that the Carrie/Saul relationship was effectively brought back to the forefront, but that the focus on Dana brought the episode down some.

=== Rating ===
This episode had 1.77 million viewers for its initial airing, a slight decline from the previous week's episode.
