= One Last Thing =

One Last Thing may refer to:

- "One Last Thing" (Homeland), episode of the American television series Homeland
- One Last Thing (film), 2018 American film
- One Last Thing..., 2005 American film
