= Uh... Oh... Ah... =

- Homeland episode
- Episode no.: Season 3 Episode 2
- Directed by: Lesli Linka Glatter
- Written by: Chip Johannessen
- Production code: 3WAH02
- Original air date: October 6, 2013
- Running time: 49 minutes

Guest appearances
- James Rebhorn as Frank Mathison; Sam Underwood as Leo Carras; Nazanin Boniadi as Fara Sherazi; Amy Hargreaves as Maggie Mathison; David Aaron Baker as Dr. Harlan; Gary Wilmes as Dr. Troy Richardson

Episode chronology
← Previous "Tin Man Is Down"	Next → "Tower of David"
- Homeland season 3

"Uh... Oh... Ah..." is the second episode of the third season of the American television drama series Homeland, and the 26th episode overall. It aired on Showtime on October 6, 2013. The episode's title is a reference to the last line of the episode, spoken by Carrie Mathison while having difficulty speaking—"Fuck you, Saul."

== Plot ==
Carrie (Claire Danes) is still reeling from Saul's (Mandy Patinkin) public disclosure of her bipolar disorder. In retaliation, she tells a reporter that Brody is innocent; the interview is interrupted by a group of policemen sent by Dar Adal (F. Murray Abraham), who have Carrie committed to a psychiatric facility for 24 hours. Quinn (Rupert Friend) visits her there to warn her of the danger she is in, but an increasingly paranoid Carrie accuses him of having been sent there by Saul to threaten her. Saul visits Carrie's father and sister and tells them that Carrie is unstable, and that they must persuade her to take her medication if they want her to get better. The following day, Carrie attends a psychiatric hearing to determine whether she should be released. When her father and sister tell her that they want her to get back on her regimen of lithium, she flies into a rage that ends with her being restrained and forcibly medicated. After witnessing this, Quinn informs Saul that he does not approve of what the agency is doing to Carrie, and that he intends to resign once his current objectives are completed.

As Dana (Morgan Saylor) tries to get back to normal following her release from the hospital, she chafes under Jessica's (Morena Baccarin) constant monitoring. She is especially upset that Jessica won't let her see Leo (Sam Underwood), now her boyfriend. One night, she runs away back to the hospital to see Leo, where they have sex. The next morning, the hospital staff finds them together, and sends Dana home. At her wits' end, Jessica asks Dana what she wants from her. Dana replies that she wants Jessica to realize that she attempted suicide because she genuinely wanted to die, but being with Leo has restored her will to live.

Saul brings in Fara Sherazi (Nazanin Boniadi), a Muslim financial analyst, to look into the transaction records of HLBC bank tied to the terrorists who committed the Langley attack. During a meeting with the bank's management and legal teams, she bluntly tells the CEO that his bank is indirectly responsible for multiple acts of terrorism; he refuses to cooperate, however. That night, Quinn confronts the CEO and makes a veiled threat on his life while hinting that he was the one who killed the banker's associate in Caracas. The CEO then agrees to turn over all of his records to the CIA, from which they are able to find past transactions, originating from the Iranian government, being sent to associates of Abu Nazir.

Saul goes to see Carrie at the psychiatric ward and apologizes to her. Carrie, struggling to speak because of the medication, whispers, "Fuck... you... Saul".

== Production ==
The episode was written by executive producer Chip Johannessen and was directed by co-executive producer Lesli Linka Glatter. It is the second episode in a row not to feature series star Damian Lewis.

== Reception ==
=== Ratings ===
This episode had 1.83 million viewers for its initial airing, a slight decline from the previous week's season premiere.

=== Reviews ===
Emily VanDerWerff of The A.V. Club gave the episode a "B+" grade, crediting the direction by Lesli Linka Glatter, while criticizing Saul's treatment of Fara as not being true to his character. Willa Paskin of Salon commended the performance of Claire Danes in this episode, saying "Danes’ skills as an actress have been praised ad infinitum, but when she does work like she does in this episode, I want to tack more compliments on to infinity". Alan Sepinwall of HitFix also praised Danes' performance, and said that her scenes were "powerful", but also thought that too much of the episode focused on Dana and her boyfriend.
