= Tin Man Is Down =

- Homeland episode
- Episode no.: Season 3 Episode 1
- Directed by: Lesli Linka Glatter
- Written by: Alex Gansa; Barbara Hall
- Production code: 3WAH01
- Original air date: September 29, 2013
- Running time: 58 minutes

Guest appearances
- James Rebhorn as Frank Mathison; Tim Guinee as Scott Ryan; Sam Underwood as Leo Carras; Amy Morton as Erin Kimball; Pedro Pascal as David Portillo; Gary Wilmes as Dr. Troy Richardson; Lawrence Clayton as Jim Pennington; Joanna Merlin as Grandma Lois

Episode chronology
← Previous "The Choice"	Next → "Uh... Oh... Ah..."
- Homeland season 3

"Tin Man Is Down" is the first episode of the third season of the American television drama series Homeland, and the 25th episode overall. It aired on Showtime on September 29, 2013.

== Plot ==
Carrie (Claire Danes) is called to testify before the United States Senate Select Committee on Intelligence 58 days after the attack on the CIA headquarters. Senator Lockhart (Tracy Letts) reveals a memo that offered Brody (Damian Lewis) immunity for his help in killing or capturing Nazir. Carrie indicates that she does not believe Brody is guilty or knew the bomb was in his car. The next day Lockhart questions where Carrie was the 14 hours after the attack when her statement claimed she was unconscious. Carrie invokes the Fifth Amendment.

Dana (Morgan Saylor) concludes a month-long stay in the hospital after having slit her wrists in the bathtub. Jessica Brody (Morena Baccarin) struggles financially and begins interviewing for jobs. Carrie's father Frank (James Rebhorn) finds out that she has stopped taking lithium. Mira (Sarita Choudhury) returns from Mumbai, but she and Saul (Mandy Patinkin) sleep in separate bedrooms, and the status of their relationship remains unclear.

The attack on Langley left a crater, and the death toll is revealed to be 219. The Iranian mastermind of the attack, Majid Javadi ("The Magician"), has not been seen in public since 1994. Six other members of the network that planned and carried out the attack on Langley have been identified and located by the CIA. After weighing his options, Saul eventually orders their simultaneous assassination. Peter Quinn (Rupert Friend) is in Caracas, Venezuela, where he decides not to place a bomb on his target's car upon seeing a boy in the back seat. He is given the order to attempt to kill his target (codenamed "Tin Man") by infiltrating his compound. Quinn shoots and kills his target but accidentally kills the boy as well. Elsewhere in the world, the other five targets are also taken out.

Carrie meets a redhead man while buying alcohol at a convenience store, and she sleeps with him that night. The next day, she sees the newspaper headline that an unnamed CIA officer slept with Brody. Carrie confronts Saul and accuses him of leaking the story. Saul is later called before the Intelligence Committee and asked to comment on the article. Saul does not give a name but says that the agent is bipolar and concealed it from her employers. Carrie watches Saul's testimony on live television and is distraught.

== Production ==
The episode was written by co-creator Alex Gansa and co-executive producer Barbara Hall, which was Hall's first writing credit after joining the writing staff this season. It was directed by co-executive producer Lesli Linka Glatter.

An unfinished version of the episode was leaked to BitTorrent on September 1, 2013, receiving over 100,000 downloads in the first few hours. Damian Lewis later blamed the leak on "hackers".

References (homages) to the work of John le Carré feature, one in a scripted line spoken by Dar Adal (F. Murray Abraham) in a restaurant scene, saying, to Saul Berenson (Mandy Patinkin), "We are pragmatists. We adapt. We are not the keepers of some sacred flame", a direct interpolation of a line originally spoken by the character of Oliver Lacon, in Smiley's People. In another scene, Dana (Morgan Saylor), refers to federal agents stationed outside the Brody residence as "Babysitters", another Le Carre-coined term used in Tinker Tailor Soldier Spy to refer to intelligence service bodyguards tasked with protecting colleagues. "The magician" was the nickname given to the character Otto Leipzig in "Smiley's People".

The final death toll of 219 differs from the 250+ bodies, laid out in rows in a large hall, in the final minutes of "The Choice".

This is the first episode of the series not to feature Damian Lewis as Nicholas Brody or David Harewood as David Estes due to the former character now being a fugitive from justice and the latter's death in the previous season's finale.

== Reception ==
=== Ratings ===
Scheduled head-to-head against the Breaking Bad series finale, the original broadcast of "Tin Man Is Down" had 1.88 million viewers, showing an increase over the previous season's premiere episode.
