= One Last Thing (Homeland) =

- Homeland episode
- Episode no.: Season 3 Episode 9
- Directed by: Jeffrey Reiner
- Written by: Barbara Hall
- Production code: 3WAH09
- Original air date: November 24, 2013
- Running time: 57 minutes

Guest appearances
- David Marciano as Virgil; Tim Guinee as Scott Ryan; Maury Sterling as Max; Donnie Keshawarz as Hafez Azizi; Jared Ward as Yousef Turani; Walid Amini as Josh Modarres; Jaylen Moore as Eric Baraz; William Abadie as Alain Bernard; Chris Chalk as Tom Walker; Navid Negahban as Abu Nazir

Episode chronology
← Previous "A Red Wheelbarrow"	Next → "Good Night"
- Homeland season 3

"One Last Thing" (previously titled "Horse and Wagon" and also known as "One Last Time") is the ninth episode of the third season of the American television drama series Homeland, and the 33rd episode overall. It premiered on Showtime on November 24, 2013.

== Plot ==
Saul (Mandy Patinkin) and Dar Adal (F. Murray Abraham) watch over the agonizing ordeal of Brody (Damian Lewis) going through heroin withdrawal. Saul has six days until Lockhart assumes control of the CIA and wants Brody to fulfill his role before then. When it looks like Brody's heroin withdrawals will take too long, Dar Adal endorses the use of ibogaine, a drug which speeds up the withdrawal process but also induces severe, violent hallucinations; Adal implies that he's used the drug for that purpose. During a bad series of hallucinations, Brody smashes a wooden chair in his room and uses a broken piece to repeatedly stab himself in the arm, as if with a needle, before Saul physically restrains him.

When Brody has been weaned off the heroin, Saul offers him a chance at redemption with a mission where he can "be a Marine again". Brody declines, saying he'd rather just die. Saul goes to Carrie (Claire Danes) and outlines his plans: Brody will seek political asylum in Iran where he will likely be hailed as a hero, with the goal of assassinating the leader of the Revolutionary Guard, which would then lead to Majid Javadi inheriting that position. Carrie, in an attempt to motivate Brody, takes him to the motel where Dana (Morgan Saylor) is now working as a maid. They sit in the car and wait until Dana comes outside, at which point Brody desperately tries to get out of the car and see her but is subdued by the soldiers flanking him.

Virgil (David Marciano) and Max (Maury Sterling) find the recording device in Saul's house and are able to trace it back to Alain Bernard (William Abadie), who is working in Israeli intelligence. Trailing him, they then take photographs of Bernard meeting with Senator Lockhart (Tracy Letts). Saul uses this information to buy more time for Brody. Lockhart agrees to postpone his appointment as the new director in exchange for Saul not exposing Lockhart as having conspired against him.

Back at the base, Brody pleads with Carrie to be allowed to tell Dana that he is innocent. Carrie retorts that even if he is innocent of the Langley bombing, there are many other things he's done he has to atone for. Carrie appeals to Brody's love of his family and eventually gets him to agree to the mission. Over a period of sixteen days, Brody is worked back into peak physical condition with the assistance of a team of special ops soldiers.

Carrie secretly takes Brody to visit Dana shortly before his scheduled departure. Brody tries to connect with Dana, apologizing for all that he's done to her and insisting that he wasn't responsible for the bombing, but Dana is upset and very standoffish. Brody leaves disheartened when Dana asks him what he wants her to say so that she'll never have to see him again. As he prepares to leave, Brody promises he will survive the mission and return to Dana and Carrie. Brody is taken back to the base where he departs for Iran.

== Production ==
The episode was directed by Jeffrey Reiner and written by co-executive producer Barbara Hall.

== Reception ==
=== Ratings ===
The original broadcast was watched by 1.94 million viewers, an increase in viewership from the previous week.

=== Critical response ===
Reception of the episode was positive. Scott Collura of IGN rated the episode 8.5 out of 10 and wrote that "for a change, Homeland hits a good balance between its emotional beats and the thriller-isms it's grown dependent on." TVLine named Damian Lewis the "Performer of the Week" for his performance in this episode, writing that "Brody's accelerated transformation from withered, defeated heroin addict to lucid, able-bodied warrior was one of the more painful and graphic in TV history."
