= Tower of David (Homeland) =

- Homeland episode
- Episode no.: Season 3 Episode 3
- Directed by: Clark Johnson
- Written by: Henry Bromell; William Bromell
- Production code: 3WAH03
- Original air date: October 13, 2013
- Running time: 53 minutes

Guest appearances
- Stephen Schnetzer as psychiatrist; Manny Pérez as El Niño; Martina García as Esme; Erik Dellums as Dr. Graham; Marcia DeBonis as Abby; Jennifer Marsala as Amanda Lambert; Jason Butler Harner as Paul Franklin

Episode chronology
← Previous "Uh... Oh... Ah..."	Next → "Game On"
- Homeland season 3

"Tower of David" is the third episode of the third season of the American television drama series Homeland, and the 27th episode overall. It aired on Showtime on October 13, 2013.

== Plot ==
Brody (Damian Lewis), suffering from two bullet wounds in the abdomen, is taken to the "Tower of David", an unfinished skyscraper project in Caracas inhabited by squatters. He is held there by a group of mercenaries led by El Niño (Manny Pérez), who is aware of Brody's identity. Brody is nursed back to health by Dr. Graham (Erik Dellums), along with Esme (Martina García), El Niño's daughter. They regularly give Brody heroin to blunt his pain. When asked by Brody why he is being so helpful, El Niño responds "You know Carrie Mathison. So do I." As Brody's health improves, he begins refusing the heroin injections as they affect his ability to think.

Carrie (Claire Danes), now medicated, pleads with her psychiatrist (Stephen Schnetzer) to pass along a message to Saul that she is doing better and that she is sorry. Later on, she momentarily loses control while in a bathroom, bashing her head into the mirror and drawing blood. A sympathetic nurse (Marcia DeBonis) finds her and agrees not to report the incident.

Brody explains to El Niño that since he went on the run, he has been taken from one place to another and that he has recovered enough from his injuries to leave and get to "the next place". El Niño refuses to let him go, replying that there is no next place, and that the tower is where he is safe, and where he needs to stay. El Niño reminds Brody that he could turn him in to the CIA for a $10 million reward. Undeterred, Brody later escapes the premises with the help of Esme. He seeks refuge at a nearby mosque. The imam lets Brody stay there, but has recognized who he is and phones the police who arrive shortly to arrest Brody. El Niño's mercenaries then arrive, killing the police officers along with the imam and his wife. They take Brody back to the tower, where an angry El Niño confines Brody to a cell, calling it Brody's new home.

Carrie is visited at the ward by Paul Franklin (Jason Butler Harner), an associate at a law firm. He claims to be representing one of the partners at the firm, offering to get Carrie released if she will speak with the partner in question. Carrie rebuffs him, as she believes that she will be expected to turn on the CIA, which she refuses to do.

Brody, alone in his cell, injects himself with heroin as the episode ends.

== Production ==
Clark Johnson directed the episode. William Bromell wrote the teleplay, which he based on a detailed outline left by his deceased father Henry Bromell. Set in Caracas, the episode was shot in Puerto Rico, and an abandoned apartment building in San Juan stood in for the Tower of David's interiors. Of the 10 credited series regulars, only Claire Danes, Damian Lewis and Mandy Patinkin appear in this episode, including Lewis making his first appearance as Nicholas Brody in the third season. This is also the first episode of the series not to feature Morena Baccarin as Jessica Brody; as such Claire Danes and Mandy Patinkin are now the only actor and actress to appear in every episode of Homeland thus far.

== Ratings ==
The original broadcast had 1.81 million viewers.
