= Clark Johnson =

American-Canadian actor and director

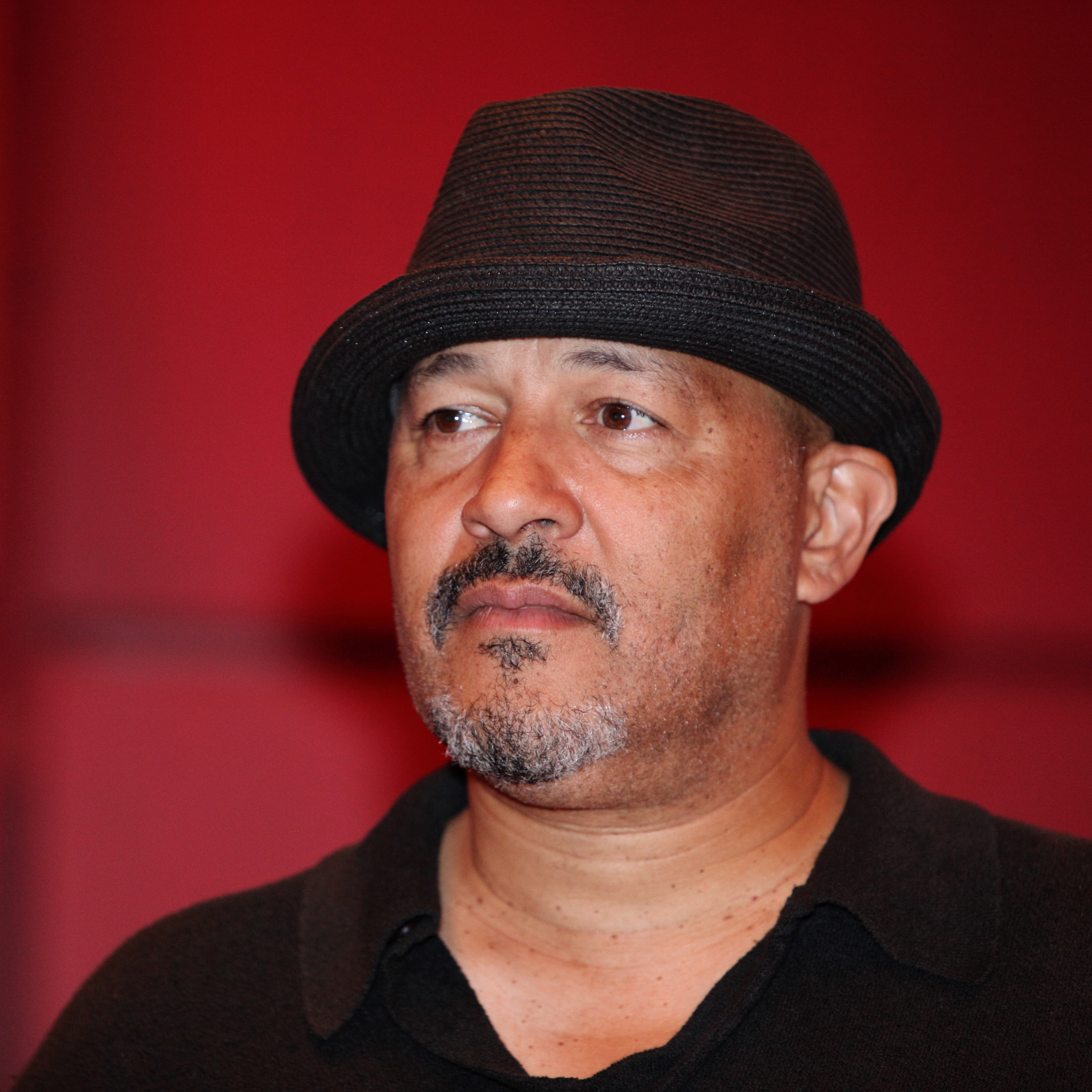
- Johnson at the 2009 Karlovy Vary International Film Festival
- Born: September 10, 1954 (age 72); Philadelphia, Pennsylvania, U.S.
- Other names: Clark "Slappy" Jackson, Clarque Johnson, J. Clark Johnson
- Education: Eastern Michigan University; University of Ottawa; Concordia University; OCAD University
- Occupations: Actor, director
- Years active: 1981–present
- Relatives: Molly Johnson (sister); Taborah Johnson (sister)

Clark Johnson (born September 10, 1954) is an American-Canadian actor and director, who has worked in both television and film. He is best known for his roles as David Jefferson on Night Heat (1985–88), Clark Roberts on E.N.G. (1989–94), Meldrick Lewis in Homicide: Life on the Street (1993–99), Augustus Haynes in The Wire (2008), and Cherry Pitts in the Marvel Cinematic Universe series Daredevil: Born Again (2025–present).

Johnson was nominated for a Primetime Emmy Award for Outstanding Directing for a Drama Series for the pilot episode of The Shield. He was nominated for a Genie Award for Best Actor for Nurse.Fighter.Boy (2008) and Best Supporting Actor for Rude (1995). At the 6th Canadian Screen Awards, he received the Earle Grey Award for lifetime achievement.

== Early years ==
Johnson was born in Philadelphia, Pennsylvania, to an Afro-Caribbean father from Trinidad and Tobago and a white mother. The family later moved to Canada. He has three siblings including jazz singer Molly Johnson and actress and singer Taborah Johnson.

Johnson attended Eastern Michigan University on a partial athletic scholarship for American football, but he was expelled after he was caught stealing food from the school cafeteria. He attended several other universities including the University of Ottawa and Loyola College/Concordia University, where he played Canadian football, before ending up at the Ontario College of Art as a film major. He was drafted by the Toronto Argonauts in the seventh round of the 1978 CFL draft but ultimately did not play professionally.

== Career ==
Johnson started in film doing special effects, including David Cronenberg's The Dead Zone. This behind-the-scenes work often served as a "backup" for him during the early stages of his acting career.

He began performing in feature films in 1981, landing roles in the films Killing 'em Softly, Colors, Wild Thing, Adventures in Babysitting, and Nowhere to Hide. He also acted in a number of television shows early in his career, including The Littlest Hobo, Night Heat, Hot Shots and E.N.G.. He starred in the first episode of The Women of Brewster Place in 1989 as Butch Fuller.

=== Homicide: Life on the Street ===
In 1993, Johnson became part of the original cast of the television series Homicide: Life on the Street playing Detective Meldrick Lewis for all seven seasons and the reunion movie, as well as directing several episodes. Johnson regularly improvised during filming and made up his own jokes and dialogue; writer and producer James Yoshimura called Clark the "king of the ad lib". Although the ensemble nature of the show meant that Johnson never played a minor role, he became an even larger presence after his character was paired with a new partner, Mike Kellerman (played by Reed Diamond). The two detectives became the central figures in a plot line surrounding a Baltimore drug lord whose financial resources and front as a devoted community servant make it nearly impossible for the police department to charge him. Johnson made the transition to director with the season four episode "Map of the Heart". He also directed "Betrayal", "Valentine's Day", "Full Court Press" and "The Twenty Percent Solution". David Simon, the author of the non-fiction book Homicide was based upon, as well as a writer and producer for the series, commented that the transition from actor to director was made easy by Johnson's familiarity with the show and that he was one of the better directors in terms of keeping the tone of the show consistent. In 2013, Johnson made a brief cameo as Lewis in the Law & Order: Special Victims Unit episode "Wonderland Story" when the squad are at a retirement party for John Munch (Richard Belzer).

=== The Wire ===
Johnson worked on The Wire, reuniting with writer David Simon. Johnson directed the pilot episode "The Target", the second and fifth first-season episodes, and the series finale. He plays Augustus Haynes, the dedicated and principled editor for The Baltimore Sun city desk.

=== Alpha House ===
In 2013, Johnson starred as Sen. Robert Bettencourt (R-PA) in Amazon's Alpha House, a political comedy written by Doonesbury creator Garry Trudeau. Along with John Goodman, Johnson plays one of four Republican senators living together in a house on Capitol Hill. Johnson also directed the season finale for the show's first season. Johnson spent the summer of 2014 filming season two.

=== Directing ===
Johnson's other directing credits include the big-screen releases The Sentinel (2006) and S.W.A.T. (2003), and episodes of Third Watch as well as the HBO original production Boycott (2001), a project which he helmed and in which he also acted. He also directed the first episodes of Seasons 1 and 2 of the 2005 mini-series Sleeper Cell. He directed the first and last episodes of The Shield, along with other episodes of that series. He directed two episodes of the Marvel Cinematic Universe series Luke Cage (2016-2018).

Johnson directed the pilot episode of the FX drama Lights Out. The series stars fellow The Wire cast members Pablo Schreiber and Reg E. Cathey and focuses on a retired heavyweight boxing champion.

Johnson is a guest instructor at HB Studio.

== Filmography ==
=== Actor ===
Film acting credits
Year	Title	Role	Notes
1987	Adventures in Babysitting	Black Gang Leader	
1988	Iron Eagle II	CPT. Richie Graves	
1989	Renegades	J.J.	
1994	Drop Zone	FBI Agent Bob Covington	
1994	Final Round	Trevon	
1995	Rude	Reece	
1995	Soul Survivor	Busha	
1997	The Planet of Junior Brown	Mr. Pool	
2000	Love Come Down	Dean	
2003	S.W.A.T.	Deke's handsome partner	Cameo appearance
2006	The Sentinel	Charlie Merriweather	Cameo appearance
2008	Nurse.Fighter.Boy	Silence	
2009	Defendor	Captain Fairbanks	
2014	Bird People	McCullan	
2015	Hyena Road	General Rilmen	
2017	Magnum Opus	Robert Cochran	
2017	Brawl in Cell Block 99	Detective Watkins	
2018	222	The King of Hearts	Short film
2019	Tammy's Always Dying	Doug	
2025	Late Fame	Arnold	
2026	Mayday		

Television acting credits
Year	Title	Role	Notes
1985–88	Night Heat	David Jefferson	18 episodes
1986	Hot Shots	Al Pendleton	13 episodes
1988–92	Katts and Dog	Lennie	3 episodes
1989	The Women of Brewster Place	Butch Fuller	2 episodes
1989–94	E.N.G.	Clarke Roberts	14 episodes
1991–92	Hammerman	Hammerman (voice)	11 episodes
1993	North of 60	Sonny Ross	Episode "Southern Comfort"
1993–99	Homicide: Life on the Street	Meldrick Lewis	122 episodes
1998	Cold Squad	Derrick Clark	2 episodes
2000	Deliberate Intent	James Perry	Television film
2000	Homicide: The Movie	Meldrick Lewis	Television film
2002	Soul Food	Terrell	Episode: "Lovers and Other Strangers"
2005	Tripping the Wire: A Stephen Tree Mystery	Stephen Tree	Television film
2008	The Wire	Gus Haynes	10 episodes
2008	The Shield	Handsome Marshal	Episode "Family Meeting"
2009	Crash & Burn	Walker Hearn	5 episodes
2012	Unforgettable	Clay Jacobs	Episode "Blind Alleys"
2013	Law & Order: Special Victims Unit	Meldrick Lewis	Episode "Wonderland Story"
2013–14	Alpha House	Sen. Robert Bettencourt	21 episodes
2018	Bosch	Howard Elias	4 episodes
2018	Seven Seconds	KJ's father	Episode "That What Follows"
2019	Evil	Father Amara	4 episodes
2025–present	Daredevil: Born Again	Clark "Cherry" Pitts	11 episodes

=== Director ===
Film directing credits
Year	Title	Notes
2003	S.W.A.T.	
2006	The Sentinel	
2019	Juanita	
2020	Percy	

Television directing credits
Year	Title	Notes
1996–98	Homicide: Life on the Street	5 episodes "Map of the Heart" "Betrayal" "Valentine's Day" "Full Court Press" "The Twenty Percent Solution"
1997	Fast Track	
1998	Welcome to Paradox	
1998	La Femme Nikita	
1999	Law & Order: Special Victims Unit	Episode: "Sophomore Jinx"
2000	NYPD Blue	Episode: "Lucky Luciano"
2000	The West Wing	Episode: "Six Meetings Before Lunch"
2000	The Beat	
2000	Third Watch	Episode: "Nature or Nurture?"
2000	City of Angels	
2000	The City	
2001	Boycott	Television film
2002–08	The Wire	4 episodes "The Target" "The Detail" "The Pager" "–30–"
2002–08	The Shield	7 episodes "Pilot" "The Spread" "Blowback" "Playing Tight" "Blood and Water" "The New Guy" "Family Meeting"
2004	The Jury	Episode: "Lamentation on the Reservation"
2004	The Secret Service	Television film
2005	N.Y.-70	Television film
2005–06	Sleeper Cell	2 episodes "Al-Faitha" "Al-Bagara"
2010–11	Memphis Beat	Episode: "It's All Right Mama"
2010–11	King	2 episodes "Lori Gilbert" "T-Bone"
2011	Homeland	5 episodes "Blind Spot" "The Vest" "Tower of David" "The Yoga Play" "Krieg Nicht Lieb"
2012	The Walking Dead	Episode: "Nebraska"
2013	Alpha House	Episode: "In the Saddle"
2014–15	Hell on Wheels	2 episodes "Bear Man" "Struck"
2015	Black Sails	2 episodes "X" "XII"
2015	American Odyssey	2 episodes "Bug Out" "Real World"
2016	Mad Dogs	Episode: "Flares"
2016	Shut Eye	Episode: "The Tower - Reversed"
2016–18	Luke Cage	2 episodes "You Know My Steez" "For Pete's Sake"
2017	Six	Episode: "Confession"
2017	Taken	Episode: "A Clockwork Swiss"
2018	The Purge	Episode: "Release The Beast"
2019–21	City on a Hill	3 episodes "High on the Looming Gallows Tree" "Apophasis" "Pax Bostonia"
2020	Your Honor	Episode: "Part Four"
2021	Mayor of Kingstown	2 episodes "Along Came a Spider" "The Devil Is Us"
2022	Alaska Daily	Episode: "It's Not Personal"
2023–24	Accused	2 episodes "Kendall's Story" "Marcus' Story"

== Awards and nominations ==
Institution	Year	Category	Work	Result
ACTRA Awards	2009	Outstanding Performance - Male	Nurse.Fighter.Boy	Nominated
Black Reel Awards	2007	Outstanding Director	The Sentinel	Nominated
Black Reel Awards	2017	Outstanding Directing, Drama Series	Luke Cage	Nominated
Black Reel Awards	2019	Outstanding Directing, TV Movie/Limited Series	Juanita	Nominated
Black Reel Awards	2017	Outstanding Directing, Drama Series	The Get Down	Nominated
Canadian Screen Awards	2018	Earle Grey Award	—N/a	Won
Gemini Awards	1995	Best Guest Performance in a Dramatic Series	E.N.G.	Nominated
Genie Awards	1996	Best Supporting Actor	Rude	Nominated
Genie Awards	2010	Best Actor	Nurse.Fighter.Boy	Nominated
NAACP Image Awards	1999	Outstanding Supporting Actor in a Drama Series	Homicide: Life on the Street	Nominated
Primetime Emmy Awards	2002	Outstanding Directing for a Drama Series	The Shield ("Pilot")	Nominated
