= David Diaan =

American film producer

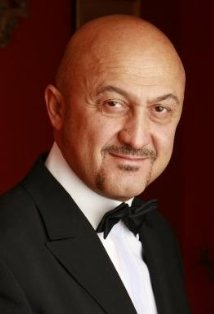
- Born: Fariborz Davoodian; Iran
- Other name: David Davoodian
- Occupations: Actor, writer, producer, entrepreneur
- Years active: 1992–present
- Website: www.MrSublime.com

David Diaan, also known as Fariborz Davoodian, is a Los Angeles–based actor, writer, producer, and entrepreneur. He is best known for his satirical plays and his hilarious approach to issues surrounding the Iranian American community in the United States. He is an avid humanitarian and activist, especially in respect to the struggles of the freedom seeking citizens of his homeland, Iran.

== Early life ==
He was born Fariborz Davoodian in Iran during the era of Shah Mohammad Reza Pahlavi. His father, Elias Davoodian, was a textile distributor who had built a reputation as a trustworthy businessman. As a hobby, David's father Elias, would produce and act in community theater productions and was quite popular in his small town in Iran. His mother, Eshrat Moluk, was born into a family of prominent physicians. As a young girl, she possessed a gift for singing, but her strict parents never allowed her to perform professionally. His parents' appreciation of performing arts were an early influence on Diaan's aspirations in the entertainment industry.

== Education and career ==
At the age of 16, Diaan left Iran and moved to Columbia, Missouri in the Midwestern United States to continue his education. There, he attended David H. Hickman High School. Afterwards, he went on the study Radio, Television and Journalism at the prestigious University of Missouri. However, David's ambitions of returning to his homeland to become a famous talk show host were postponed due to the sudden changes in the social and political climate of his country after the Iranian Revolution. Iran and the United States had at this point become enemies. Left virtually stranded away from home, David took a job as a marketing agent for a national houseware wholesaler to earn his tuition money. Prior to finishing college, David had already established himself as successful young entrepreneur. Soon after, he moved to Los Angeles, California and co-founded The Express Group, Inc. which later transformed into deliverLA.com. Among his other entrepreneurial endeavors is his partnership in SOGOLI, Inc., a company which designs and manufactures high end custom jewelry in the United States and exports to various countries.

== Artistic career ==
Diaan's experience in the entertainment industry began when he started "Liquid Productions" in Los Angeles, California together with other talents such as now well-known comedian Maz Jobrani. This young group wrote and produced the first Iranian/American play in English which became an instant hit amongst the younger generation.His popular theater company which produced successful shows such as The Belind Date, The 99 Cent Family and Death Comedy has toured across the United States and Canada. Since then, Diaan has written and produced multiple theatrical plays, hosted his own popular radio show on KIRN 670 AM, and produced and hosted a television show for channel one TV named “It's a mad mad mad mad world". His television show reached millions of Iranians worldwide through satellite and internet.

Despite the risks attached to this journey, Diaan returned to his homeland after 24 years in the summer of 2000, to direct and produce the touching and informative documentary Iran is My Home. This film was an official selection at the IFP Los Angeles Film Festival. In 2004 he took his first stab at screenplay writing for a feature film entitled The Apology. The screenplay won first prize at the Slamdance Film Festival's screenplay competition. Diaan's production company, Sublime Entertainment, has produced independent feature films such as Otis E. starring Kevin Durand and Peter Storemare, America So Beautiful and The Dogwalker. Diaan's dramatic performance alongside Academy Award nominee, Shohreh Aghdashloo in The Stoning of Soraya M., earned him high praise and excellent reviews. In 2012, his performance as prime minister Mossadegh, in a film by the same title, earned him the best actor prize at the San Antonio Film Festival.

== Personal life ==
Diaan resides in Los Angeles, California with his family. He travels with his theater group to different cities and communities across the United States and Canada. He also contributes much of his time and talent to various charitable organizations.

== Filmography ==
Year	Movie/Project	Role	Notes
2020	I Do Not!	Mohamad	(Short)
2019	Forgive Me		(Short)
2019	Cuck	Abbas	
2018	Little King	Babak	(Short)
2018	Roya	Farhad	(Short)
2017	Children of the Revolution	Manuchehr	(Short)
2016	The Persian Connection	Danush	
2016	1979 Revolution: Black Friday	Hamoyoon Shirazi	(Video Game)
2015	Roksana	Hamid	(Short)
2015	Baba Joon	Dariush	
2015	In Her Place	Ali	(Short)
2014	The Interview	Palestinian President	
2013	Frankly, Rebecca	Dr. Arkin	(Short)
2013	Silk	Sameer	(Short)
2012	Revolution	Ahmad	(Short)
2012	Mossadegh	Mohammad Mossadegh	(Short)
2010	Nose Job	Roya's Father	(Short)
2010	Peep World	Hari	
2009	Speaking of Baghdad	Hesitant Man	(Documentary Short)
2009	The Colony	Trader	(Documentary)
2009	Convict	Hamid	
2008	The Stoning of Soraya M.	Ebrahim	
2007	The Ten	Landlord	
2006	Art School Confidential	Future Critic #1	
2004	Air	Mr. Amrani/Father	(Short)
2003	Iran Is My Home	Self	(Documentary)
2003	Irangeles	Hamid Azizi	
2002	The Dogwalker	Angry Client	
2002	I Call Myself Persian	Self	(Documentary)
2001	America So Beautiful	Parviz	

== Television ==
Year	Show	Role	Notes
2020	SEAL Team	Akhtar Zahed	2 episodes
2020	DC's Legends of Tomorrow	Mr. Tarazi	"Miss Me, Kiss Me, Love Me"
2018	S.W.A.T.	Terzian	"Fire and Smoke"
2017	Curb Your Enthusiasm	Consul	"The Pickle Gambit"
2016-17	Valet	Houshang Hakimi	6 episodes
2015	Madam Secretary	Shakya	"Waiting for Taleju"
2015	The Brink	General Ahmed Ali	4 episodes
2015	Bones	Omid Turan	"The Murder in the Middle East"
2015	NCIS: Los Angeles	Vakeel Shah	"Fighting Shadows"
2014	Agents of S.H.I.E.L.D.	Elias	"Making Friends and Influencing People"
2013	Homeland	Masud Sherazi	2 episodes
2011	Wainy Days	Hotel Manager	"Kelly and Arielle Part 2"
2011	NCIS	Farid Bawali	"Safe Harbor"
2010	Weeds	Daoud Mahmud	2 episodes
2010	Parks and Recreation	Saïd	"Leslie's House"
2008	The Unit	Vet	"Shadow Riders"
2008	Quarterlife	Victor	"Home Sweet Home"
