= William Abadie =

French actor (born 1977)

- Abadie in 2026
- Born: 16 February 1977 (age 49); Saint-Raphaël, Var, France
- Occupation: Actor
- Years active: 2002–present

William Abadie (born 16 February 1977) is a French actor. He is best known for his roles in television series such as Gossip Girl (2007–2009), Sex and The City (2003), Homeland (2013), The O.C. (2006), Ugly Betty (2006) and Emily in Paris (2020–present).

== Early life ==
Abadie was born in Saint Raphaël in southern France. He spent his adolescence between Megève and Paris before leaving the French capital at the age of 25 to relocate to New York, where he enrolled at The Lee Strasberg Theater Institute.

== Life and career ==
William is a graduate of L'École Claude Mathieu in Paris and The Lee Strasberg Theater Institute in New York City. He was honored with a Life Time Membership at the Actors Studio in 2000. Two years later, during the run of his self-produced Off-Broadway production of Dennis McIntyre's Modigliani (2002), he received positive reviews from The New York Times Theater Critic, Anita Gates. This milestone allowed him to attract established representation, which led to the start of his professional film and television career in the United States.

Abadie portrayed memorable characters in some of America's most acclaimed and iconic TV shows: Sex and the City, The O.C., ER, Entourage, Ugly Betty, 90210, Gossip Girl, Person of Interest, The Mentalist, Gotham, as well as the Golden Globe Award-winning show Homeland. On the silver screen Abadie has appeared in blockbusters including Resident Evil: Extinction and Shawn Levy's The Pink Panther, in which he plays opposite Steve Martin. In the Emmy and Golden-Globe nominated Netflix comedy-drama Emily in Paris, he plays Antoine Lambert, the seductive and married owner of a French fragrance house.

In early 2022 William took on the role of Zed in the HBO Max reboot of Sex and The City: And Just Like That.

He is an accomplished Alpine snowboarder, triathlete, Ironman Lake Placid finisher, as well as a devoted marathon runner with dozens of races. Abadie resides in New York City and Paris.

== Filmography ==
=== Film ===
Year	Title	Role	Notes	Ref.
2002	Unfaithful	Passerby		
2006	The Pink Panther	Bizu		
2007	Resident Evil: Extinction	French Envoy		
2008	My Sassy Girl	Jean-Jacques		
2008	The Con is On	Gurmukh		
2008	The Human Contract	Joseph		
2009	Give 'Em Hell, Malone	Pretty Boy		
2014	The Longest Week	Concierge		
2020	Waiting for Anya	Father Lasalle		
2026	Greenland 2: Migration	Denis Laurent		

=== Television ===
Year	Title	Role	Notes	Ref.
2003	Sex and the City	Tony	Episode: "Lights, Camera, Relationship"	
2003	ER	David	Episode: "Makemba"	
2006	Ugly Betty	Phillippe Michel	Episode: "Pilot"	
2006	CSI: NY	Michel Hetu	Episode: "Fare Game"	
2006	The O.C.	Jean Claude	Episode: "The Metamorphosis"	
2007	Entourage	Hotel Manager	Episode: "The Cannes Kids"	
2007	Samantha Who?	Rene	Episode: "Pilot"	
2007–2009	Gossip Girl	Roman	2 episodes	
2008	Chuck	Guy Lafleur	Episode: "Chuck Versus the Ex"	
2008	Cashmere Mafia	Gerard Dumais	2 episodes	
2009	Royal Pains	Javier Santos	Episode: "Crazy Love"	
2010	90210	Olivier	Episode: "Meet the Parent"	
2011	Pan Am	Gasper	Episode: "We'll Always Have Paris"	
2013	White Collar	Henri	Episode: "The Original"	
2013	Blue Bloods	Alex Schecter	Episode: "Devil's Breath"	
2013	Homeland	Alan Bernard	5 episodes	
2014	Person of Interest	Christos Sevon	Episode: "Allegiance"	
2014	The Mentalist	Hugo Joubert	Episode: "Black Market"	
2015	Madam Secretary	Swiss Ambassador Claude Wuthrich	Episode: "The Greater Good"	
2016	Gotham	Dr. Maxwell Symon	Episode: "Blood Rush"	
2019	Sweetbitter	Etienne	Episode: "Truffles and Champagne"	
2020–present	Emily in Paris	Antoine Lambert	18 episodes	
2022–2023	And Just Like That…	Zed	4 episodes	
2026	Hit Point	TBA	Upcoming thriller	

=== Video games ===
Year	Title	Role	Ref.
2006	Call of Duty 3	Pierre LaRoche	
2018	Red Dead Redemption 2	Jean-Marc Mercier	
