= Shaun Toub =

American actor (born 1958)

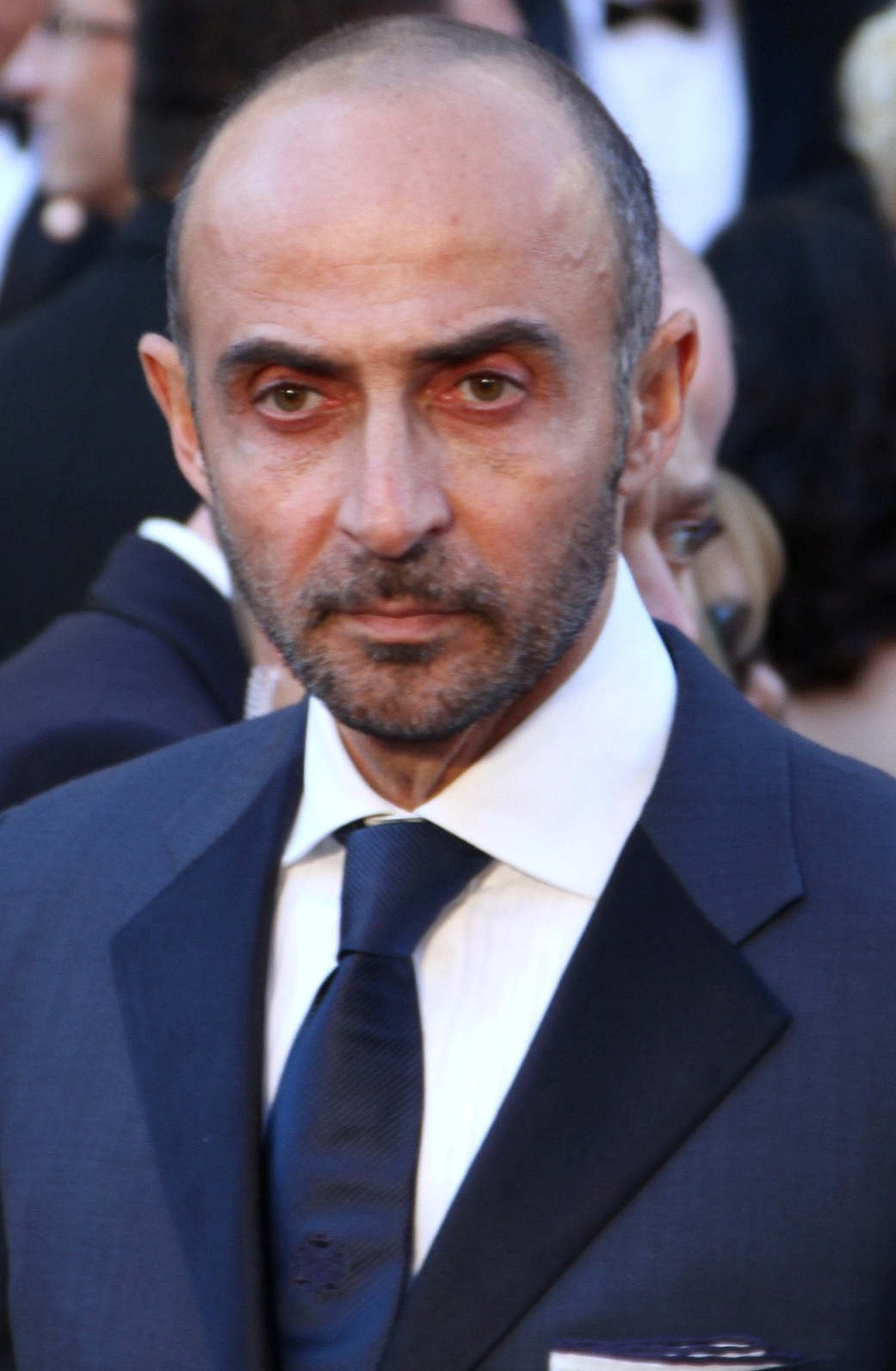
- Toub at the 83rd Academy Awards in 2011
- Born: February 15, 1958 (age 68); Tehran, Imperial State of Iran
- Education: University of Southern California
- Occupation: Actor
- Years active: 1988–present

Shaun Toub (born February 15, 1958) is an American actor. He has played the character Yinsen in Iron Man (2008) and Iron Man 3 (2013); Farhad in Crash (2004); Rahim Khan in The Kite Runner (2007); Majid Javadi in the Showtime television series Homeland; and Faraz Kamali in the Apple TV+ Israeli series Tehran (2020–2025).

== Early life ==
Toub was born to an Iranian Jewish family, in Tehran, Imperial State of Iran. His parents were both podiatrists. At age 2, he moved to Manchester, England, where his mother attended podiatry school. He returned to Iran, where he lived until he was 13, before moving to Switzerland. He moved to Nashua, New Hampshire to finish his last year of high school. He decided at age five to become an actor.

== Career ==
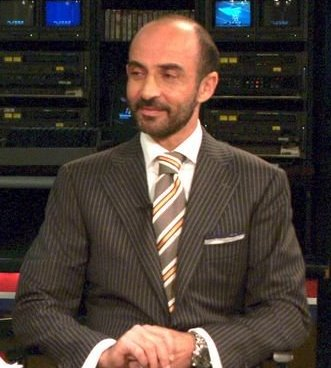
Toub in 2007

His filmography includes his performance in Michael Bay's Bad Boys with Will Smith and Martin Lawrence, John Woo's Broken Arrow with John Travolta and Christian Slater and Mick Jackson's Live from Baghdad starring Michael Keaton and Helena Bonham Carter for HBO. His performance as Farhad in Paul Haggis's Oscar-winning film Crash received positive reviews. He played the part of the Virgin Mary's father in The Nativity Story. He also played Rahim Khan in The Kite Runner (2007). In the series Grimm, he played the part of Bonaparte, one of the villains of the latest series.

He received the Cinema Sepharad Award at the 2022 Los Angeles Sephardic Film Festival.

== Filmography ==
=== Films ===
Year	Title	Role	Notes
1988	Out of Time	Speechmaker	Television film
1988	Glitz	Maitre d'	Television film
1989	Dark Holiday	Prison Soldier	Television film
1991	Before the Storm	Jeep Soldier	Television film
1993	Desperate Rescue: The Cathy Mahone Story		
1993	Hot Shots! Part Deux	Sleeping Guard	
1995	OP Center	Lt. Arkov	Television film
1995	Bad Boys	Store Clerk	
1996	Broken Arrow	Max	
1996	Executive Decision	Terrorist #5	
1996	Suddenly	Mr. Tabibsidan	Television film
1997	Path to Paradise	El Sayyid Nosair	Television film
1997	Steel Sharks	Capt. Reza Lashgar	
1997	Out to Sea	Bettor in Front	
1999	Stigmata	Doctor	
1999	D.R.E.A.M. Team	Prince Ali Saleed	Television film
2002	Maryam	Dr. Darius Armin	
2002	Live from Baghdad	Sadoun Al-Jenabi	Television film
2003	Underground	Dark Skinned Man	Short film
2004	Land of Plenty	Hassan	
2004	Crash	Farhad	
2006	The Path to 9/11	Emad Salem	Television film
2006	The Nativity Story	Joaquim	
2007	The Kite Runner	Rahim Khan	
2007	Charlie Wilson's War	Hassan	Uncredited
2008	Iron Man	Ho Yinsen	
2010	The Last Airbender	Uncle Iroh	
2011	Setup	Roth	
2013	Papa	Evan Shipman	
2013	Iron Man 3	Ho Yinsen	Cameo
2014	Stretch	Nasseem	
2014	Unity	Narrator	Documentary
2015	Papa: Hemingway in Cuba	Evan Shipman	
2016	War Dogs	Marlboro	
2020	Ghosts of War	Mr. Helwig	

=== Television ===
Year	Title	Role	Notes
1988	Hunter	Phillip DePaul/Stephen Avak	Episodes "Need Justice: Part 1" and "Need Justice: Part 2"
1990	Columbo	Amir	Episode: "Agenda for Murder"
1990	Matlock	Rahmad Hussein	Episode: "Nowhere to Turn"
1990	Dragnet	Ralph Singas	Episode: "Queen of Hearts"
1990	Gabriel's Fire	Attendant	Episode: "Windows"
1991	Under Cover	Jeep Soldier	Episode: "Sacrifices"
1991	In the Heat of the Night	Cabby	Episode: "Unfinished Business"
1993	Bodies of Evidence	Rajeeb Kambata	Episode: "Eleven Grains of Sand"
1993–97	Lois & Clark: The New Adventures of Superman	Asabi	Episodes "Pilot", "Neverending Battle", "I'm Looking Through You" and "All Shook Up", "Seconds" and "I've Got You Under My Skin"
1994	Living Single	Cabby	Episode: "Fatal Distraction"
1994	Café Americain	Colonel Faisal	Episode: "Love the One You're With"
1994	One West Waikiki	Joseph Kastrami	Episode: "Terminal Island"
1994	The Bold and the Beautiful	Moustafa	2 episodes
1994	Married... with Children	Akbar	Episode: "A Man for No Seasons"
1995	Ellen	Foreign Man	Episode: "Hello, I Must Be Going"
1995	JAG	Prison Commandant	Episode: "Scimitar"
1996	Sisters	Weatherman	Episode: "Don't Go to Springfield"
1996	Nash Bridges	Cecil Riskin	Episode: "Hit Parade"
1996	Sliders	Kheri-Heb	Episode: "Slide Like an Egyptian"
1996–97	Pacific Blue	Mahmood	Episodes "Outlaw Extreme" and "The Last Ride"
1997	Walker, Texas Ranger	Lance	Episode: "Last Hope"
1997	ER	Butler	Episode: "Ground Zero"
1997	Seinfeld	Pinter	Episode: "The Betrayal"
1997	The Visitor	—N/a	Episode: "Going Home"
1998	Early Edition	Hassan Rejim	Episode: "Mum's the Word"
1998	Cybill	Scary Man	Episode: "Ka-Boom!"
1998	Soldier of Fortune, Inc.	Hamzed Ali Amin	Episode: "Iraq and Roll"
1999	G vs E	Dr. Clean	Episode: "Evilator"
1999	CI5: The New Professionals	Shabadi	Episode: "Orbit"
1999	Just Shoot Me!	Ernesto	Episode: "Love Is in the Air"
2000	Cover Me	Spiros	Episode: "Where Have You Gone, Sandy Koufax?"
2000	Charmed	Triad Member #2	Episodes "Magic Hour", "Sight Unseen" and "Power Outrage"
2001	Malcolm in the Middle	Janic	Episode: "Hal Quits"
2001	The Sopranos	Arouk Abboubi	Episode: "Employee of the Month"
2001	Son of the Beach	Mohammed	Episode: "Chip's a Goy"
2001	Special Unit 2	Herkamer	Episode: "The Wraps"
2001	The District	Boris	Episodes "Fools Russian: Part 1" and "Fools Russian: Part 2"
2001	The Division	Yuri	Episode: "The First Hit's Free, Baby"
2002	She Spies	Joshua Bick	Episode: "Poster Girl"
2003	The Agency	Colonel Tambour - Al Tayeh's Deputy	Episode: "Unholy Alliances"
2006–07	Smith	Jerry	Episodes "Pilot", "Three" and "Four"
2007	Lost	Sami	Episode: "Enter 77"
2008	NCIS	Khalid Mohammed Bakr	Episode: "Tribes"
2009	The Unit	Misha Belikov	Episode: "Bad Beat"
2009	Chuck	Dr. Mohammed Zamir	Episode: "Chuck Versus the Broken Heart"
2011	Castle	Philip Boyd	Episode: "Head Case"
2012	Luck	Dr. Khan	Episodes "Ace Forces Escalante to Swap Jockeys" and "Two Prized Colts Go Head-to-Head"
2012	Last Resort	Admiral Safir Ahsan	Episode: "Cinderella Liberty"
2013, 2017	Homeland	Majid Javadi	10 episodes
2015	The Blacklist	Commander Kushan	Episode: "Ruslan Denisov"
2016	Grimm	Conrad Bonaparte	4 episodes
2020	Little America	Faraz	Episode: "The Rock"
2020–21	Snowpiercer	Terence	8 episodes
2020–25	Tehran	Faraz Kamali	Main role

=== Video game ===
Year	Title	Role	Notes
1996	Spycraft: The Great Game	Onyx	
2008	Iron Man	Ho Yinsen	
