= Nazanin Boniadi =

British actress and activist (born 1979)

- نازنین بنیادی
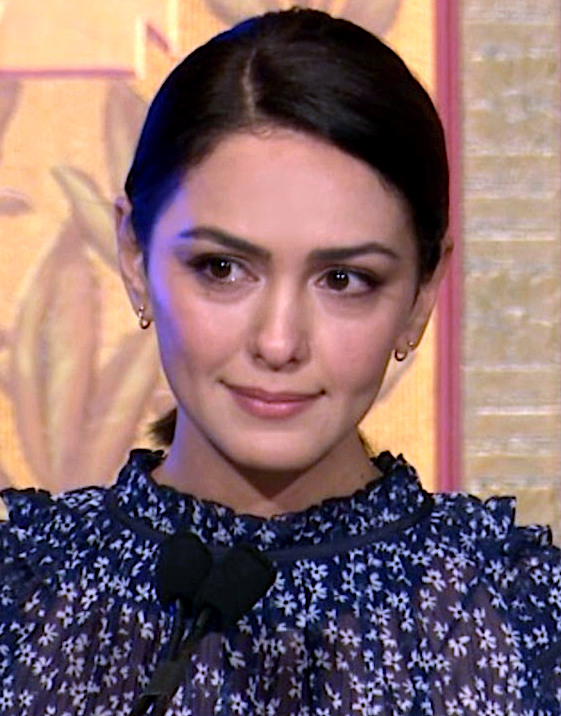
- Boniadi in 2018
- Born: 22 May 1979 (age 47); Tehran, Iran
- Education: University of California, Irvine (BS)
- Occupations: Actress; activist
- Years active: 2006–present
- Website: nazaninboniadi.com

Nazanin Boniadi (/ˈnɑːzəniːn ˈboʊnjɑːdi/; [nɑːzæˈniːn bonjɑːˈdiː]; born 22 May 1979) is a British actress and activist. Born in Tehran and raised in London, she attended university in the United States, where she landed her first major acting role as Leyla Mir in the soap opera General Hospital (2007–2009) and its spin-off General Hospital: Night Shift (2007). Since then, Boniadi has played Nora in the sitcom How I Met Your Mother (2011), Fara Sherazi in the spy thriller series Homeland (2013–2014), Esther in the historical drama film Ben-Hur (2016), Clare Quayle in the sci-fi thriller series Counterpart (2017–2018), Zahra Kashani in the action thriller film Hotel Mumbai (2018), and Bronwyn in the first season of the fantasy series The Lord of the Rings: The Rings of Power (2022).

She was an Amnesty International spokesperson from 2009 to 2015 and served as a board member for the Center for Human Rights in Iran from October 2015 until February 2021. Her focus has been on youth and women's rights.

== Early life ==
Nazanin Boniadi was born 22 May 1979 in Tehran following the Iranian Revolution. Less than a month after her birth, she and her parents left Iran and applied to become political refugees in London.

Boniadi attended an independent school in Hampstead, London. As a young girl, she played violin and performed ballet.

Boniadi earned a bachelor's degree with honours, in biological sciences from the University of California, Irvine (UCI). At UCI, she won the Chang Pin-Chun Undergraduate Research Award for molecular research involving cancer treatment and heart transplant rejection. Boniadi was also assistant editor-in-chief of MedTimes, UCI's undergraduate medical newspaper.

Boniadi changed her career path from science to pursue acting in 2006. In 2009, she studied a contemporary drama short course at the Royal Academy of Dramatic Art in London.

== Acting career ==
Boniadi's first major acting role was as Leyla Mir on the daytime drama General Hospital and its SOAPnet spin-off series General Hospital: Night Shift, making her the first contract actor to play a Middle Eastern character in American daytime television history. She is also the first actress born in Iran to ever be on contract on an American soap opera.

Boniadi played supporting roles in several major Hollywood film productions, such as Charlie Wilson's War, Iron Man, and The Next Three Days.

She played Nora, a love interest for Neil Patrick Harris's character Barney Stinson, on the sixth season of the hit CBS show How I Met Your Mother in 2011. She reprised this role during the show's seventh and ninth seasons.

In August 2012, Boniadi starred opposite George Clooney in a Nespresso TV ad.

In May 2013, Boniadi joined the cast of Homeland season 3 as CIA analyst Fara Sherazi, and was promoted to a series regular for the show's fourth season.

Boniadi also appeared in an eight-episode arc on season 3 of Scandal as antagonist Adnan Salif. She portrayed Esther, the title character's wife, in the 2016 remake of Ben-Hur.

She narrated the soundtrack to the 2014 Iranian documentary film, To Light a Candle, made by Maziar Bahari and focusing on the state-sanctioned persecution of Baháʼís in Iran.

She starred with Dev Patel and Armie Hammer in the 2018 feature film Hotel Mumbai, a dramatisation of the 2008 Mumbai attacks, as British-Iranian heiress Zahra Kashani.

From 2018 to 2019, Boniadi received critical acclaim for portraying the series regular role of Clare Quayle in the Starz espionage drama Counterpart.

In early 2020, it was revealed that Boniadi had been cast in an undisclosed role in The Lord of the Rings: The Rings of Power on Amazon Prime. In February 2022, it was announced she would be playing the character of Bronwyn, described as a single mother and healer. Boniadi stepped aside from the role prior to the show filming its second season; the role was not recast. Despite initial reporting, she clarified that the choice was unrelated to her decision to prioritize her advocacy.

In 2024, Boniadi joined the cast of the independent thriller, The Saviors, alongside Adam Scott, Danielle Deadwyler, Greg Kinnear, Ron Perlman, Colleen Camp, Kate Berlant, and Theo Rossi.

== Activism ==
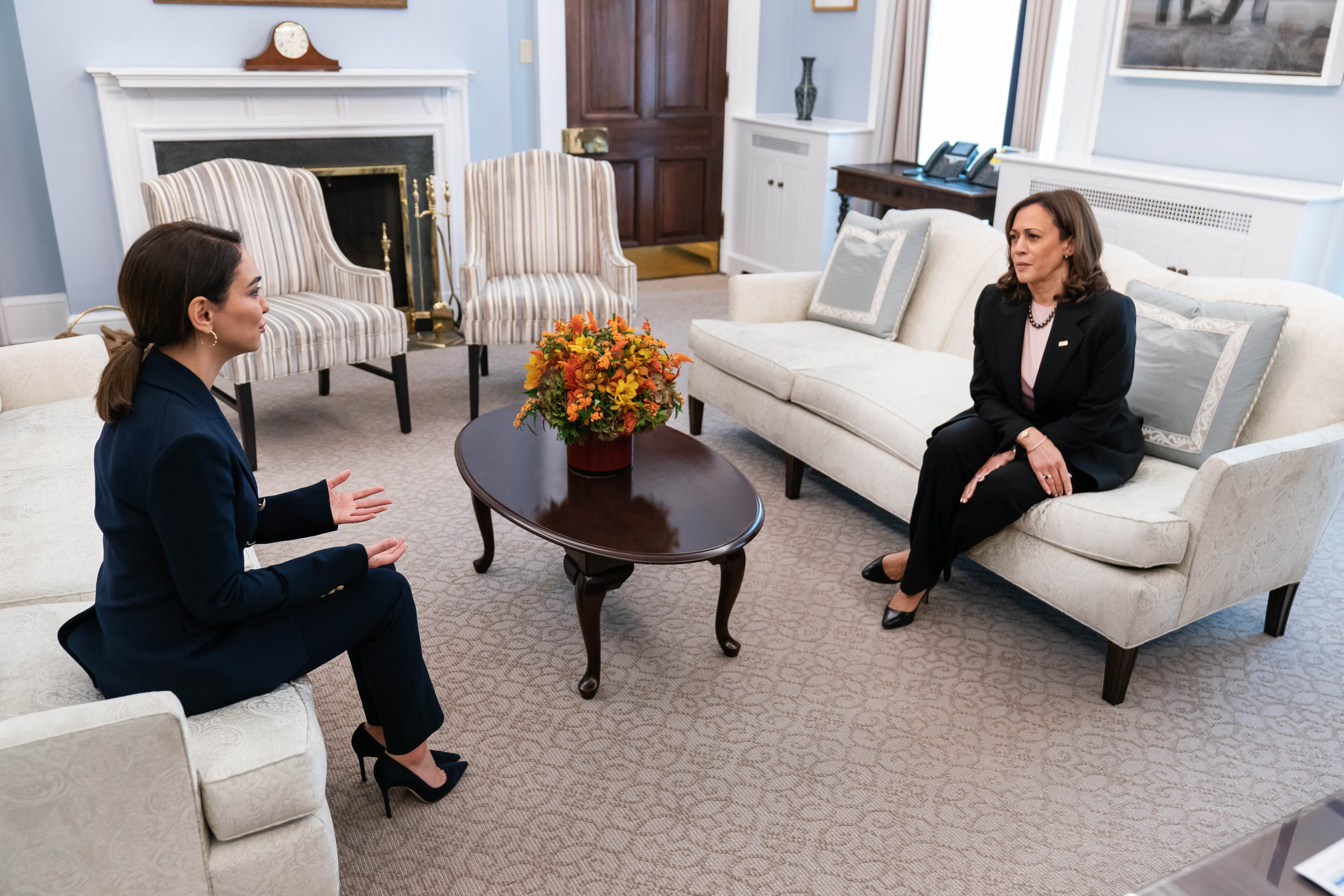
Boniadi and Kamala Harris discuss Mahsa Amini protests, October 2022

Boniadi has been involved in human rights activism, with a focus on youth and women's rights. She was a spokesperson for Amnesty International USA (AIUSA), with a focus on the conviction and treatment of Iranian youth, women, and prisoners of conscience, from 2009 until 2015. She has her own official blog page on the AIUSA website and continues to partner with them. In 2020, she was appointed as an ambassador for Amnesty International UK, with a focus on women and Iran.

In 2009, Boniadi provided a voiceover to AIUSA's "Power of Words" public service announcement introduced by Morgan Freeman; campaigned with the organization for the International Violence Against Women Act (I-VAWA); served as a panelist and emcee for events related to Iranian rights; and spearheaded The Neda Project with AIUSA.

In December 2010, she initiated an Amnesty International petition for Iranian film directors Jafar Panahi and Mohammad Rasoulof, who had been convicted of "propaganda against the state". The petition generated more than 21,000 signatures, including those of prominent Hollywood directors and actors such as Martin Scorsese, Harvey Weinstein, and Sean Penn. On 8 June 2011, she joined a delegation, led by Hollywood director Paul Haggis and AIUSA Executive Director Larry Cox, to deliver the petition to the Iran Mission to the United Nations in New York.

On 3 June 2011, Boniadi joined Sarah Shourd in a rolling hunger strike and wrote an article in support of the Free the Hikers campaign, pertaining to the imprisonment of Shane Bauer and Josh Fattal in Iran after they trespassed into Iranian territory from Iraq.

On 9 April 2012, Boniadi returned to her alma mater, UCI, in support of the Education Under Fire campaign, calling for an end to state-sanctioned discrimination and persecution of Baháʼís in Iran.

Boniadi delivered the keynote closing remarks at the 2012 XX Factor, Amnesty International USA's annual town hall meeting on women's rights, in Washington, D.C.

In December 2012, Boniadi worked with Roxana Saberi to launch an Amnesty International petition and campaign to free an imprisoned filmmaker Behrouz Ghobadi, brother of acclaimed filmmaker Bahman Ghobadi, in Iran, who was detained on unspecified national security charges. The petition included signatures from prominent Hollywood directors and actors, as well as major film industry organizations and festivals. On 22 January 2013, Amnesty International announced that Behrouz Ghobadi had been released on bail from prison in Iran.

She was a keynote speaker at Congresswoman Eddie Bernice Johnson's 13th annual "A World of Women for World Peace" conference in Dallas, Texas in May 2013.

She has written op-eds about human rights for media outlets such as CNN, The Washington Post, and Defense One.

In 2014, Boniadi was selected as a term member by the American think tank Council on Foreign Relations (CFR). She was subsequently selected as a lifetime member of the CFR in 2020.

She served as a member of the board of directors of the Center for Human Rights in Iran from October 2015 until February 2021.

In April 2019, she was interviewed by CBC News Network anchor Natasha Fatah about the fate of human rights lawyer, Nasrin Sotoudeh, sentenced for up to 38 years in Tehran. She has also appeared on BBC World News and CNN International.

In September 2022, she became active during the Mahsa Amini protests, and urged foreign governments to aid the protesters. On 14 October 2022, she met with Kamala Harris, then Vice President of the United States, following the protests in Iran. In an informal session of United Nations Security Council in November 2022, she claimed that the notion that the hijab was a part of Iran's culture is a "myth".

In an interview with ABC News in Australia in June 2023, she praised Australia for voting in favour of a US-sponsored resolution to remove Iran from the UN Commission on the Status of Women. Boniadi requested that the Australian Government designate the IRGC as a terror organisation and encourage the UK, Europe, Canada to do the same. She claimed that China facilitating peace between Iran and Saudi Arabia—undertaken to restore diplomatic ties between the two long-time enemies—was apparently driven by the ulterior intention of "replacing the US and the West as a global superpower". Commenting on the Gaza war in October 2023, Boniadi wrote on X: "the Islamic Republic's strategic support of Hamas has diverted attention away from its ongoing crimes against the Iranian people".

Against the backdrop of the 2025–2026 Iranian protests, she called on Hollywood to join and stand on the side of the protesters following reports of the deaths and detentions of protestors.

== Personal life ==
Boniadi is fluent in English and Persian. She was living in Los Angeles, California, U.S., in 2017. She had never married, never had children

Her parents fled Iran in her infancy. Since then, Boniadi has only visited Iran once, during her teenage years.

=== Scientology ===
In the mid-2000s, she was a dedicated Scientologist. Her mother had also been a Scientologist.

In late 2004 to early 2005, she allegedly had a brief relationship with actor Tom Cruise. According to claims in the documentary Going Clear, her acquaintance with Cruise was not accidental, and the Church of Scientology prepared and planted her for this role wanting to ensure his commitment to the church after he had drifted away from it during his marriage to Nicole Kidman. The church also vetted her along with dozens of other women as a potential wife for Cruise, but she was not selected. In October 2004, Boniadi was volunteering for the Office of Special Affairs in Los Angeles when she was told by Church official Greg Wilhere that she had been selected for a special project. Boniadi was told that her dental braces had to be removed and that her red hair highlights had to be corrected; she was also encouraged to end her relationship with her longtime boyfriend. After being flown to New York by the church, Boniadi learned that her project was to become a suitable girlfriend for Cruise.

According to Boniadi, Cruise initially overwhelmed her with the intensity of his affection but she was isolated from her family and the two of them were rarely alone, always surrounded by an entourage of Scientologists. Allegedly, he became cold and withdrawn after something she said to Scientology co-founder David Miscavige was misconstrued as an insult. She was later asked to leave and move into the Celebrity Centre. After their relationship ended in January 2005, Boniadi confessed her devastation to a friend and fellow church member. She was allegedly punished by having to dig ditches at midnight and scrub floor tiles. The Church of Scientology denied that any such project existed or that David Miscavige has any involvement in Cruise's personal life. Boniadi left the Church of Scientology soon afterward.

On 10 May 2017, American journalist Tony Ortega reported on FBI testimony that Boniadi had given in January 2010 regarding her relationship with Cruise through the Church of Scientology. Boniadi's testimony describes how the Church's Office of Special Affairs selected her to be Cruise's girlfriend.

In 2017, she tweeted congratulations to Leah Remini and Mike Rinder on their series Scientology and the Aftermath winning an Emmy Award.

In a later interview with the Los Angeles Times, Boniadi described her role in Counterpart as cathartic and therapeutic, saying "sometimes there are personal traumas that you don't ever talk about publicly but you pour it into your work". She continued: "this idea of shedding indoctrination and finding out who you are for me is a strong one. It has been extremely therapeutic for me to be able to put it out into the world through my art as opposed to openly discussing it."

== Recognition and awards ==
- c. 2000: UCI's Chang Pin-Chun Undergraduate Research Award, for molecular research involving cancer treatment and heart transplant rejection
- 2008: Nominated, NAACP Image Award for Outstanding Actress in a Daytime Drama Series in 2008 for her role in General Hospital
- 2009: Webby Award for AIUSA's "Power of Words" public service announcement, introduced by Morgan Freeman, voiceover by Boniadi
- 2011: Social Cinema Award at the Ischia Global Film & Music Festival for her human rights work with Amnesty International
- 2014: Program for Torture Victims City of Second Chances Award
- 2015: Nominated, Screen Actors Guild Award for Outstanding Performance by an Ensemble in a Drama Series, for Homeland
- 2018: Selected by People magazine as one of their "25 Women Changing the World"
- 2019: Nominated, Best Actress in a Leading Role at the Australian Academy of Cinema and Television Arts (AACTA) Awards, for Hotel Mumbai
- 2020: Freedom House Raising Awareness Award
- 2020: Ellis Island Medal of Honor
- 2023: Sydney Peace Prize

== Filmography ==
=== Film ===
Year	Film	Role	Notes
2006	Kal: Yesterday & Tomorrow	Simmi	Short film
2007	Gameface	Taylor	
2008	Charlie Wilson's War	Afghan Refugee Woman	Uncredited
2008	Iron Man	Amira Ahmed	
2009	Diplomacy	Persian Interpreter	Short film
2010	The Next Three Days	Woman with kid	
2012	Shirin in Love	Shirin	
2015	Desert Dancer	Parisa Ghaffarian	
2016	Ben-Hur	Esther	
2016	Passengers	Wake-Up Hologram	Uncredited
2018	Hotel Mumbai	Zahra Kashani	
2019	Bombshell	Rudi Bakhtiar	
2026	A Mosquito in the Ear	Daniela	Also executive producer
TBA	The Saviors		Post-production

=== Television ===
Year	Title	Role	Notes
2007	The Game	Josie	2 episodes
2007	General Hospital: Night Shift	Leyla Mir	13 episodes
2007–2009	General Hospital	Leyla Mir	119 episodes
2010	The Deep End	Heather Mosson	Episode: "To Have and to Hold"
2010	24	Blonde Woman	2 episodes
2010	Hawthorne	Aneesa Amara	Episode: "Final Curtain"
2011	Suits	Lauren Pearl	Episode: "Errors and Omissions"
2011, 2014	How I Met Your Mother	Nora	10 episodes
2012	CSI: Crime Scene Investigation	Nurse Lauren	Episode: "Seeing Red"
2012	Best Friends Forever	Naya	2 episodes
2013	Go On	Hannah	Episode: "Gooooaaaallll Doll!"
2013	Grey's Anatomy	Amrita	Episode: "The Face of Change"
2013–2014	Homeland	Fara Sherazi	12 episodes
2014	Scandal	Adnan Salif	7 episodes
2017–2018	Counterpart	Clare Quayle	17 episodes
2022	The Lord of the Rings: The Rings of Power	Bronwyn	Main role (Season 1)

== See also ==
- List of Iranian actresses
