= Polish jazz =

Music genre

Polish jazz has a history that spans periods of both acceptance and political repression.

== Before communism (1930–39) ==
The beginning of jazz in Poland is difficult to determine. As early as the 1930s, clubs in Warsaw, Kraków, Rzeszów or Poznań would play some jazz. This tended to be swing and some of it was influenced by the traditional classical music. American popular music (particularly songs by George Gershwin) was in great demand. Eddie Rosner is considered to be the first Polish jazz musician of significance.

== Stalinist repression (1945–58) ==
After the Communist takeover, jazz was initially repressed. Although groups like Melomani existed, jazz was officially condemned and forbidden from the radio. Musicians learned about jazz by listening to a shortwave radio broadcast of Willis Conover's Voice of America Jazz Hour or smuggling jazz records from abroad. Soon Polish jazz musicians started organizing concerts and the first official jazz festival took place in Sopot in 1956.

== Liberalisation (Out of the Underground 1958–67) ==
After the death of Soviet leader Joseph Stalin, jazz in Poland gained renewed freedom. In 1958, Dave Brubeck visited Poland and the nation's jazz scene became influenced by cool jazz. By the sixties, three strands had emerged as dominant; trad jazz, "mainstream", and free jazz. Krzysztof Komeda became the leader of a modern jazz movement that did not copy the American way of playing but developed its own "European" style, especially with his album Astigmatic recorded in December 1965.

== Polish jazz musicians ==
- Hanna Banaszak (born 1957) – vocalist
- Darek Oleszkiewicz - bassist
- Jacek Bednarek – bassist
- Marek Bliziński – guitarist
- Krzesimir Dębski – violinist, pianist, composer
- Urszula Dudziak – singer
- Maciej Fortuna – trumpeter
- Bogdan Hołownia – pianist (Berklee College of Music graduate)
- Marcin Jahr – drummer
- Sławek Jaskułke – pianist
- Kazimierz Jonkisz – drummer
- Anna Maria Jopek – vocalist
- Wojciech Karolak – Hammond organist, keyboardist, pianist (describes himself as "an American jazz and R&B musician, born by mistake in the middle of Europe")
- Jacek Kochan – drummer, composer
- Krzysztof Komeda – composer, pianist, movie scoring (associated with Roman Polanski)
- Sławomir Kulpowicz – pianist, composer, (influenced by the music of India and the music of John Coltrane)
- Andrzej Kurylewicz – pianist, trumpeter, trombonist, composer (also classical music)
- Adam Makowicz – pianist (currently living in Toronto)
- Marcin Masecki – pianist (Berklee College of Music graduate)
- Dorota Miśkiewicz – vocalist
- Michał Miśkiewicz – drummer
- Leszek Możdżer – pianist
- Janusz Muniak – saxophonist
- Zbigniew Namysłowski – alto saxophonist
- Marek Napiórkowski – guitarist
- Bartlomiej Oles – drummer (free improvisation)
- Marcin Oles – bassist (free improvisation)
- Włodzimierz Pawlik – Grammy Award winner for Night in Calisia pianist, composer
- Adam Pierończyk – saxophonist
- Andrzej Przybielski – trumpeter
- Zbigniew Seifert – violinist, saxophonist, (influenced by the music of John Coltrane)
- Władysław (Adzik) Sendecki - pianist
- Stanisław Sojka (Stan Soyka) – vocalist, pianist, guitarist, songwriter
- Tomasz Stańko – trumpeter (recorded for ECM) and composer, associated with free jazz and the avant-garde
- Jarosław Śmietana - guitarist
- Adam Taubitz – violinist (also classical with the Berlin Philharmonic)
- Andrzej Trzaskowski – pianist, composer
- Michał Urbaniak – violinist, saxophonist (the only Polish jazz musician to perform and record with Miles Davis)
- Marcin Wasilewski – pianist
- Jan Ptaszyn Wróblewski – tenor and baritone saxophonist, composer, arranger, (jazz DJ at the Polskie Radio Program III)
- Aga Zaryan – vocalist (Blue Note Records recording artist)
- Andrzej Zaucha – vocalist

== See also ==
- List of Polish jazz groups
