= Andrzej Łukasik =

Polish jazz musician

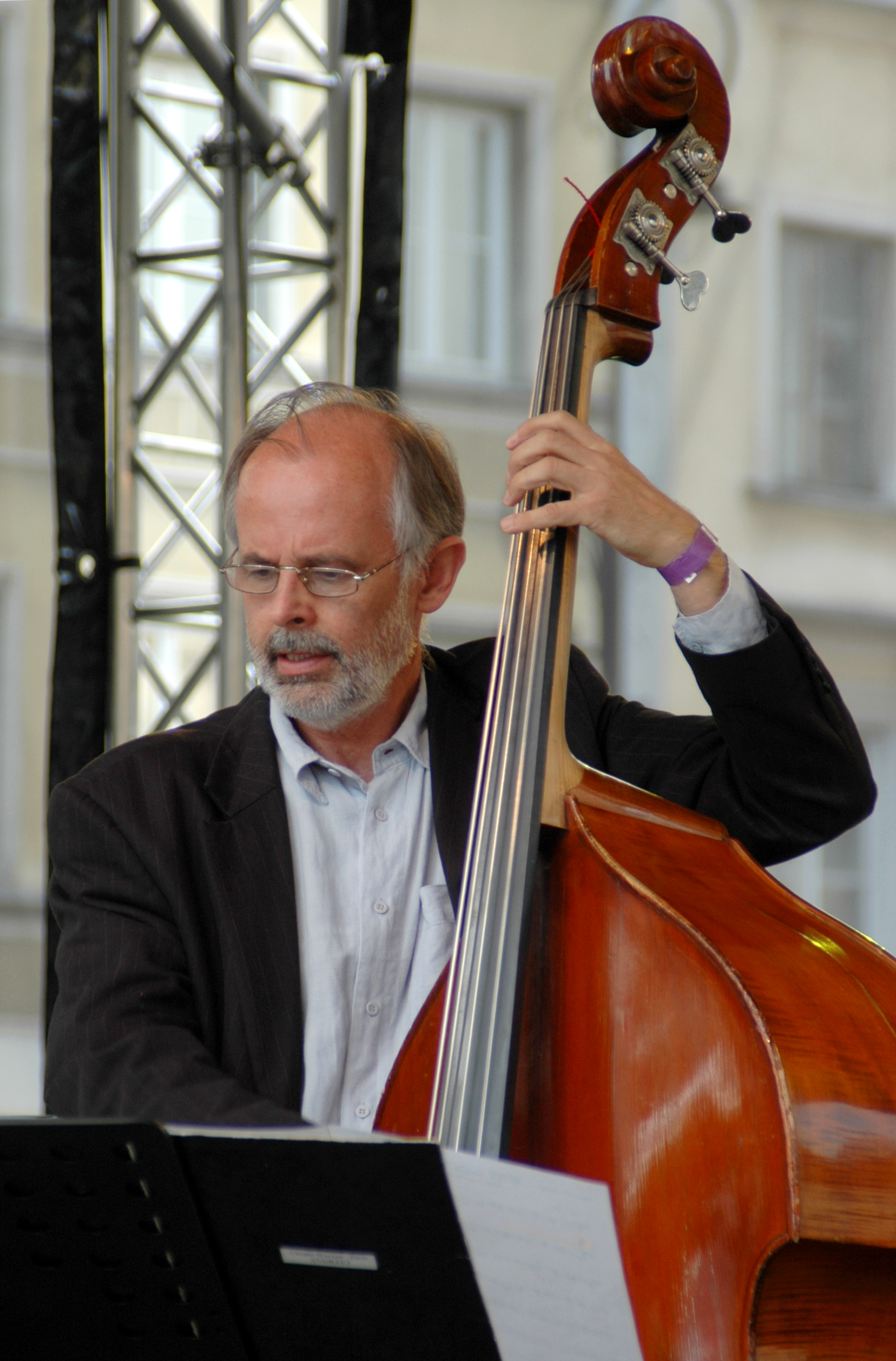
Andrzej Łukasik, Warsaw 2011

Andrzej Łukasik (born 1 September 1955 in Warsaw) is a Polish jazz double bassist and record producer.

== Biography ==
A former student of the Frederick Chopin Music Academy in Warsaw in the contrabass class of Professor Andrzej Mysiński, Łukasik began his jazz musician career in 1978, in the Kazimierz Jonkisz Quintet, where he played with Krzesimir Dębski, Andrzej Olejniczak and Janusz Skowron. The ensemble, with the same members, made a recording and took part in the 1980 Jazz Jamboree Festival in Warsaw. At the beginning of the 1980s, as a bass player, he was a recipient of an annual Krzysztof Komeda Prize musical scholarship. In 1984, together with Krzysztof Woliński, they received a commendation for their performance during the jazz festival in Hoeilaart (Belgium).

Over his career, Łukasik has collaborated with Polish jazz musicians such as Włodzimierz Nahorny, Henryk Miśkiewicz, Andrzej Jagodziński, Tomasz Szukalski, Andrzej Olejniczak, Paweł Perliński, Robert Majewski, Janusz Skowron, Maciej Strzelczyk, Krzesimir Dębski and Janusz Muniak.

Łukasik has worked with Włodzimierz Nahorny, Novi Singers, Kazimierz Jonkisz, Paweł Perliński, Andrzej Trzaskowski Polish Radio and Television Big Band, Project Grappelli and the Warsaw Paris Jazz Quintet. In 2004, with Janusz Szrom and Andrzej Jagodziński formed the group “Straszni Panowie Trzej”, which continues to perform.

Łukasik also collaborated with notable Polish artists (actors, writers, musicians) not involved with jazz music including, among others: Krzysztof Jakowicz, Andrzej Wróbel, Wojciech Młynarski, Jerzy Derfl, Krystyna Janda, Joanna Trzepiecińska, Zbigniew Zamachowski, Piotr Machalica, Artur Andrus, Andrzej Poniedzielski and Bogdan Loebl.

As an instigator, promoter and producer of many music projects, Łukasik oversaw the five year cycle of concerts entitled “Jazz, Powidła, Lasy”(later renamed “Warsaw Jazz Evenings”) emceed by the comedian, Artur Andrus, that presented the star vocalists of jazz including, among others: Ewa Bem, Lora Szafran, Iza Zając, Ewa Uryga, Andrzej Dąbrowski, Janusz Szrom, Marek Bałata, Krzysztof Kiljański, Marc Thomas, Miles Griffith, Monty Waters, Sibel Kose and many others.

Since 1994, he has owned and is operating a music production and promotion company “Blue Note Agencja Artystyczna” (Blue Note Artistic Agency) that organizes concerts and festivals and produces recordings of CDs.

Two of his albums received Gold Record status:” Straszni Panowie Trzej” (“The Three, Terribly Gentle Men”) and “Pogadaj Ze Mną” (“Talk to Me”) (both in 2009).

== Selected discography ==
=== Jazz music ensembles ===
- 1980 – Tiritaka with Kazimierz Jonkisz Quintet – Polskie Nagrania
- 1982 – XYZ with Kazimierz Jonkisz Quintet – Polskie Nagrania
- 1984 – Purpurowa Bossa with Completorium – Polskie Nagrania
- 1984 – Jazz Hoeilaart – Rainbow, Belgium
- 1988 – Pryvilege with Marianna Wróblewska – Polskie Nagrania Muza
- 1991 – Obejmij mnie – Polskie Nagrania
- 1995 – Jobim with Maciej Strzelczyk – Polonia Records
- 1997 – Kolędy with Marzena Ślusarska – Polonia Records
- 1999 – Suita na wiolonczelę i trio jazzowe with Andrzej Wróbel – Acte Prealable
- 2006 – Straszni Panowie Trzej with Janusz Szrom and Andrzej Jagodziński – Agora
- 2007 – Cicho, cicho pastuszkowie with Włodzimierz Nahorny – Blue Note Artistic Agency
- 2008 – Project Grappelli – Agora
- 2008 – Pogadaj ze Mną – Agora
- 2010 – Chopin Symphony Jazz Project with Warsaw Paris Jazz Quintet – Blue Note Artistic Agency
- 2014 – Straszni Panowie Trzej 2 with Janusz Szrom and Andrzej Jagodziński – Blue Note

=== Other recordings ===
- 1980 – Nasza Basia Kochana – Polskie Nagrania
- 1986 – Edyta Gepert Recital-Live – Pronit
- 1989 – Gdzie się podziały tamte prywatki – Polskie Nagrania
- 1995 – Róbmy Swoje’95 – Polskie Nagrania
- 1996 – Młynarski Recital’71 – Polskie Nagrania
- 1996 – Nobel’96 - Wisława Szymborska – Uniwersal Music, Poland
- 1996 – Łucja Prus – Piosenki, Wisława Szymborska – Wiersze – Acord
- 2007 – Ryś – EMI Music Poland

=== Album production and promotion ===
- 2006 – Straszni Panowie Trzej
- 2007 – Cicho, cicho pastuszkowie
- 2008 – Project Grappelli
- 2008 – Pogadaj ze Mną
- 2009 – Chopin/Jagodziński Sonata b-moll
- 2010 – Chopin Symphony Jazz Project

== Films and theatre ==
=== Music composer ===
- 1996 – Tajny Detektyw

=== Music performance ===
- 1989 – Deja vu
- 1994 – Oczy Niebieskie
- 1996 - Tajny Detektyw
- 1998 - Milena
- 1998 - Dokument Podróży
- 2000 - Kamienica na Nalewkach
- 2001 - Poranek Kojota
- 2003 - Magiczna gwiazda
- 2007 - Ryś

=== Minor roles in movies ===
- 1996 – Pułkownik Kwiatkowski
- 2001 – Poranek Kojota
- 2003 – Tygrysy Europy

== Bibliography ==
- Straszni Panowie Trzej
- Cicho, cicho pastuszkowie | Wykonawcy
- Project Grappelli | Muzycy
- Pogadaj ze mną | Muzycy
- Chopin Warsaw - Paris Jazz Quintet | Muzycy
- Agencja Artystyczna Blue Note - Artyści
- FilmPolski.pl - Andrzej Łukasik
