= Tomasz Szukalski =

Polish musical artist

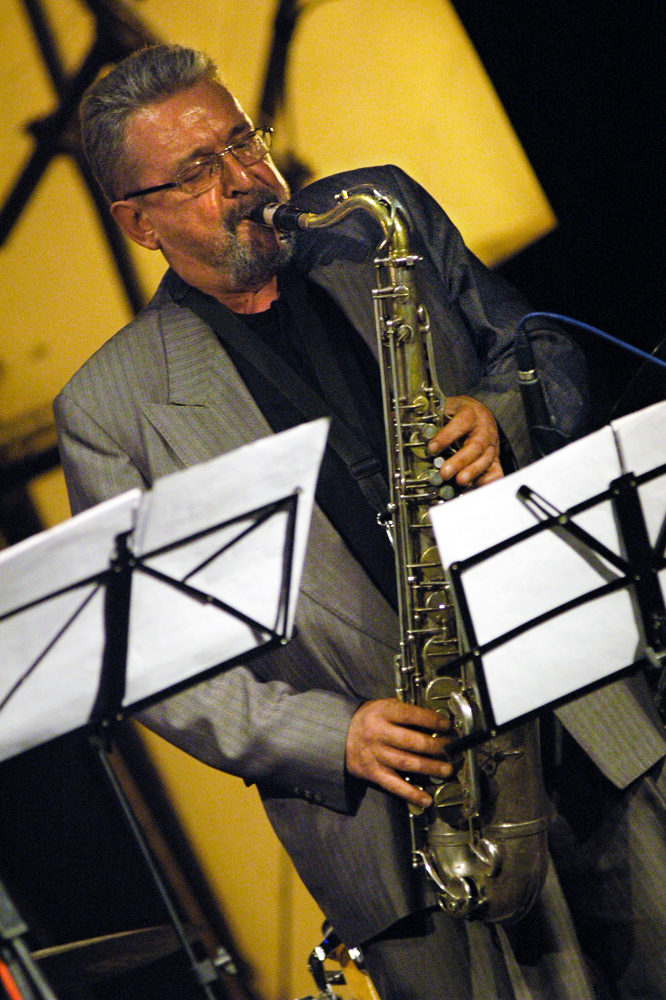
- Tomasz Szukalski @ Camaldolese crypt of Bielany (Warsaw), October, 2008

Background information
- Born: 25 December 1947; Warsaw; Polish People's Republic
- Died: 2 August 2012 (aged 64)
- Occupation: Musician
- Musical career
- Genre: Jazz
- Instrument: Saxophone
- Years active: 1966-2011
- Labels: ECM; Polskie Nagrania Muza; Supraphon; Helicon; Poljazz; Leo Records; GOWI Records; Polonia Records; Sony Music Entertainment Poland; Universal Music Polska
- Website: Tomasz Szukalski homepage

Tomasz Szukalski (25 December 1947 in Warsaw, Polish People's Republic, registered by Soviet authorities 8 January 1948 – 2 August 2012 in Piaseczno, Poland) was a Polish jazz saxophonist, composer and improviser. Szukalski worked with Tomasz Stańko, Edward Vesala and Zbigniew Namysłowski. Awarded Magister of Music (Master of Arts) at Fryderyk Chopin University of Music, Warsaw. Szukalski was a revered master of tenor saxophone and his style was often compared to that of John Coltrane and Ben Webster.

== Life and career ==
=== Early years ===
Szukalski studied clarinet but preferred to perform on tenor saxophone, soprano saxophone and on special occasions on bass clarinet or baritone saxophone. Being experiment friendly, he once tried a chainsaw.

Szukalski began his career in the jazz orchestras of Zbigniew Namysłowski and Jan Ptaszyn Wróblewski. Other members of the bands included Tomasz Stańko, Zbigniew Seifert, Adam Makowicz, Włodzimierz Nahorny, Janusz Muniak, Michał Urbaniak and Tomasz's lifelong mate Wojciech Karolak.

=== Tomasz Stańko, ECM and SBB ===
In the 1970s, Szukalski's performances became more avant-garde and free. While he continued to perform with Tomasz Stańko, he also worked with Peter Warren and Edward Vesala as well as Arild Andersen, Dave Holland, Palle Danielsson, Palle Mikkelborg, Terje Rypdal, Juhani Aaltonen and Antti Hytti.

During this period, in 1975, he recorded with Stańko on the trumpeter's album entitled "Balladyna" for ECM. Parallel to touring Scandinavia and West Europe with other jazz musicians, Szukalski performed in Poland with the Silesian rockband SBB.

=== The Quartet and Józef Skrzek ===
In 1977, Szukalski consolidated his own band The Quartet, which soon gained high reputation. His bandmates were Sławomir Kulpowicz, Paweł Jarzębski and Janusz Stefański. Some of the last concerts of this famous constellation were performed according to various sources in 1979 or 1980 at Village Vanguard in New York. In the years 1980-1981 Szukalski continued a duo cooperation with SBB's leader Józef Skrzek. The planned bookings for autumn 1981 joint performance of SBB and his own The Quartet at the Jazz Jamboree festival, due to the tense political situation in Poland, were not finalized. The duo realized the album "Ambitus Extended" and Szukalski also performed with Józef Skrzek and his short living project Józef Skrzek Formation. They toured across Polish People's Republic and Czechoslovakia and performed the soundtrack for the science-fiction movie "The War of the Worlds: Next Century" (1981).

Just weeks before the onset of martial law in Poland Tomasz performed with Józef Skrzek, Andrzej Ryszka, Sławomir Piwowar, Andrzej Urny, Dean Brown and Gil Goldstein in Warsaw and with his The Quartet mates at a workshop in memory of John Coltrane "We'll Remember Coltrane" (New Jazz Meeting), organised by Joachim-Ernst Berendt at Südwestfunk in Baden-Baden, where also Tomasz Stańko, Albert Mangelsdorff and John Coltrane's drummer Rashied Ali were present. During his stay in Vienna, following December 1981 Czechoslovakia tour (performing "Ambitus Extended" with Józef Skrzek), martial law was imposed and Szukalski returned home.

=== Martial law - Time killers ===
To survive the martial law in Poland Szukalski re-joined the orchestra of Jan Ptaszyn Wróblewski playing known American standards. In 1984, he recorded with his old mates Wojciech Karolak and Czesław Bartkowski the groovy "Time Killers", which instantly became a hit. In 1985, Tomasz consolidated his new quartet with Piotr Biskupski, Andrzej Cudzich and Andrzej Jagodziński and eventually his friend and neighbour, the drummer Marek Stach, but the new quartet did not survive due lack of performances and the atmosphere of martial law. Tomasz's custom made Henri Selmer Paris tenor saxophone and Julius Keilwerth soprano saxophone have been stolen in Warsaw a couple of months before he moved to his cabin outside Warsaw.

=== Artur, Alain, Antti, Apostolis, Arild ===
After 1990, Szukalski performed in various constellations, recorded as sideman and special guest, and started a long lasting cooperation with the young pianist Artur Dutkiewicz. During the last decade of the 20th century and the first of the 21st century, Tomasz performed with Artur Dutkiewicz, Wojciech Karolak, Alain Brunet (the French jazz trumpeter and vice minister of culture), Tadeusz Nalepa, Piotr Wojtasik, Wojciech Majewski, Tomasz Stańko, Palle Danielsson, Janusz Skowron, Karin Krog and Antti Hytti and again as special guest of the reunited rockband SBB. During 2007 and 2008 Szukalski with his young Polish drummer Krzysztof Dziedzic and his Norwegian friend, the bassist Arild Andersen, toured with Apostolis Anthimos as Apostolis Anthimos Quartet. At his hermitage cabin outside Warsaw Tomasz was visited by his friends and musicians inviting him to their recording sessions and performances, most often by the pianists Artur Dutkiewicz and Wojciech Majewski who always relied on "uncle Tom's" advice. Tomasz only occasionally visited Warsaw, e.g. to meet the ill Czesław Niemen just a couple of weeks before his death.

=== Death ===
Szukalski lost his father's home (occupied by soviet invaders), divorced and spent nearly two decades in his primitive cabin outside Warsaw, where he lived permanently since 2003. Even at his rural hermitage the soviet provocations, invigilation and robberies didn't stop and Tomasz was even visited by a policeman demanding to teach him playing a trumpet and staying at Tomasz's cabin overnight. After one such visit Tomasz's driving licence was revoked. The Quartet reunited and performed a few concerts across Europe in 2006 and 2007 but soon Sławomir Kulpowicz died. Around 2009, homeless and ill, Szukalski gained some attention from friends, especially from Artur Dutkiewicz, who organised "The Day of The Jackal" (Polish: Dzień Szakala) benefit concerts in several major Polish cities. The last and most extensive, organised in Warsaw on November 21, 2010, became the greatest jazz performance of this year in Poland, outperforming even the venerated Jazz Jamboree. The following musicians performed at the last benefit and some of them helped Tomasz find a place at an artists asylum in Skolimów outside Warsaw:

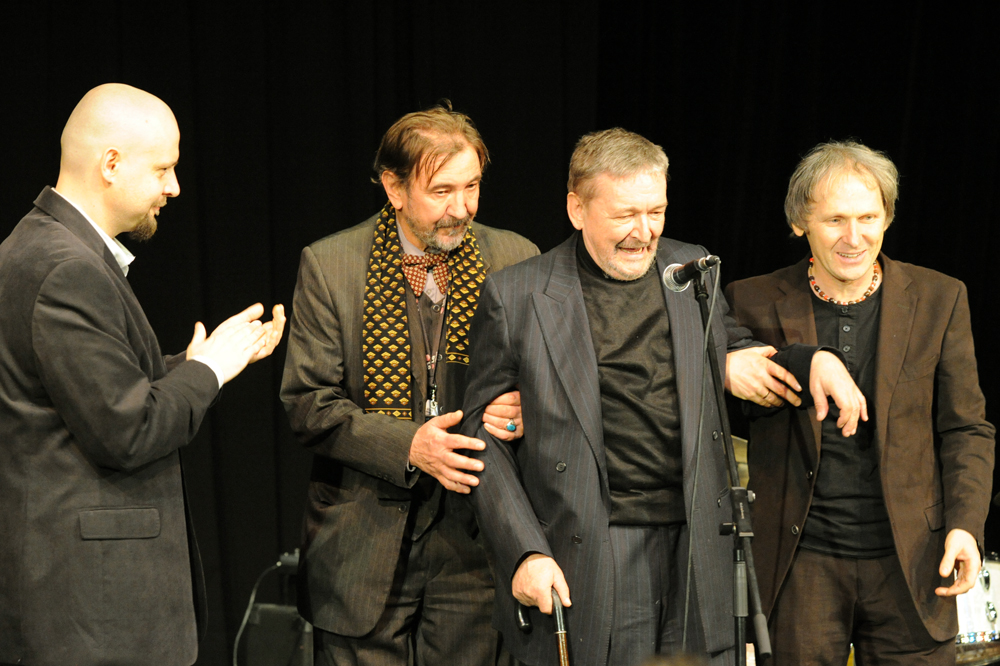
Tomasz Szukalski - homeless and ailing at "Day of The Jackal" benefit, November 21, 2010, Warsaw (Artur Dutkiewicz to the right)

- Michał Barański - double bass
- Ewa Bem - vocal
- Danel Biel - double bass
- David Dorůžka - guitar
- Urszula Dudziak - vocal
- Artur Dutkiewicz - piano
- Tomasz Grzegorski - sax
- Krzysztof Herdzin - piano
- Borys Janczarski - sax
- Paweł Jarzębski - double bass
- Kazimierz Jonkisz - drums
- Wojciech Karolak - Hammond organ
- Tomasz Krawczyk - guitar
- Sławomir Kurkiewicz - double bass
- Robert Majewski - piano
- Adam Makowicz - piano
- Michał Miśkiewicz - drums
- Leszek Możdżer - piano
- Łukasz Poprawski - sax
- Wojciech Pulcyn - bass
- Janusz Stefański - drums
- Józef Skrzek - piano, minimoog, harmonica, vocal
- Jorgos Skolias - vocal
- Tomasz Stańko - trumpet
- Krzysztof Ścierański - bass, guitar
- Jarosław Śmietana - guitar
- Jan Smoczyński - piano
- Michał Tokaj - piano
- Michał Urbaniak - violin
- Marcin Wasilewski - piano
- Aga Zaryan - vocal
- Łukasz Żyta - drums

After a couple of months spent at artists asylum, Szukalski died on August 2, 2012, at a hospital in Piaseczno, Poland His funeral was held on August 8, 2012, at Bródno Cemetery, just one kilometre, less than a mile, from his family's stolen and occupied home.

In 2012, Szukalski was posthumously awarded with the Medal for Merit to Culture - Gloria Artis for his achievements for the Polish culture and in 2013 with Fryderyk (in Gold), the Polish equivalent of the Grammy Award, for the works of his lifetime.

== Heritage ==
=== In popular culture ===
Tomasz Stańko wrote about Tomasz Szukalski in his 2010 autobiography:

This was completely improvised music (TWET). Transcendental. This greenhorn Szukalski was a revelation. He was playing perfectly from the very beginning. The very best musicians are like this. When I was playing with him, I've always been surprised. He was very creative in the band (with Edward Vesala), what we mostly appreciated was his sound, his expression. I had to rely on top class musicians, and in Poland there were just a few; Szukalski, Szczurek, Skowron. Whoever he was playing with, he was the better performer.

Also some of Szukalski's other friends e.g. Jarosław Śmietana, Wojciech Karolak, Krzysztof Dziedzic and others often made references to Tomasz Szukalski's impact on Polish Jazz. Their popular clip "A Story of Polish Jazz" covers all great Polish jazz musicians often referring to Szukalski.

Szukalski appears in the Polish science-fiction movie "Wojna Światów - następne stulecie" (War of the Worlds - Next Century) by Piotr Szulkin and in some jazz documentaries by Andrzej Wasylewski, e.g. "We'll Remember Coltrane" and the recent multimedia publication "Jazzowe dzieje Polaków" (Jazz History of the Poles). Although being co-composer of the "Wojna Światów - następne stulecie" (War of the Worlds - Next Century) soundtrack and even shortly appearing in one scene, performing "Interception" from the soundtrack album (64th-67th minute of the movie), Szukalski remains uncredited in this pre-martial law production.

Szukalski's popular pseudonym Szakal (Jackal), may also refer to his playing style since the word is derived from the Persian شغال shoghāl, which is in turn derived from the Sanskrit शृगाल śṛgāla meaning "the howler". The pseudonym used by his younger close friends was wujek Tomek (uncle Tom) or simple wujek (uncle), this is because his relations were very direct, whole-hearted and uncompromised. Some of his best friends, e.g. The Quartet musicians and two SBB technicians were able to communicate with Jackal/Uncle nonverbally - a gift very helpful during performances.

=== Selected discography ===
Recorded	Issued	Title	Performer	Kind	Label
1970-1972	2018	On Stage 1970/1972	Niemen	live bootleg	New Music - Green Tree – GTR 170
1972	1974	Koncert podwójny na 5 solistów i orkiestrę (Double Concerto for Five Soloists and Orchestra)	Tomasz Szukalski, Zbigniew Seifert, Janusz Muniak, Włodzimierz Nahorny, Zbigniew Namysłowski, Czesław Niemen, Bronisław Suchanek, Janusz Stefański, Stu Martin, Tomasz Stańko, Jan Jarczyk, Jan Ptaszyn Wróblewski and others	live in studio	Poljazz Z-SXL 0553
1972		Sound of Marianna Wróblewska	Marianna Wróblewska		Polskie Nagrania Muza SXL 0847
1972		Naga 1	Niebiesko-Czarni		Polskie Nagrania Muza SXL 0881
1972		Naga 2	Niebiesko-Czarni		Polskie Nagrania Muza SXL 0882
1973		Winobranie; Vintage)	Zbigniew Namysłowski		Polskie Nagrania Muza SXL 0952
1973		Rien ne va plus	Novi Singers		Polskie Nagrania Muza SXL 1009
1973		Night Jam Session in Warsaw 1973	All Stars After Hours	live	Polskie Nagrania Muza SXL 1033
1973		Interjazz 3	Tomasz Szukalski, John McLaughlin and others	live, compilation	Supraphon 1 15 1739
1974		Easy!	Wojciech Karolak		Polskie Nagrania Muza SXL 1069
1974		Chałturnik	S.P.P.T. Chałturnik		Polskie Nagrania Muza SXL 1079
1974		TWET	Tomasz Stańko, Peter Warren, Edward Vesala, Tomasz Szukalski	live in studio	Polskie Nagrania Muza SXL 1138
1974		Sprzedawcy glonów (Algae Dealers)	Jan Ptaszyn Wróblewski	live in studio	Polskie Nagrania Muza SXL 1141
1975		Kujaviak Goes Funky	Zbigniew Namysłowski Quintet		Polskie Nagrania Muza SX 1230
1975		Three Thousands Points	Krzysztof Sadowski		Polskie Nagrania Muza SX 1277
1975	2004	Sikorki (Tits)	SBB	live in studio	Metal Mind Productions
1975		Jazz Jamboree 75 Vol. 2	Karin Krog & Zbigniew Namysłowski Quintet	live	Polskie Nagrania Muza SX 1340
1975	1976; 1993; 2008	Balladyna	Tomasz Stańko, Tomasz Szukalski, Dave Holland, Edward Vesala	live in studio	ECM Records 1071, 1777597
1976		Ach! Jak Przyjemnie	Sami Swoi	live in studio	Polskie Nagrania Muza SX 1353
1972-1976	2009	A Double Concerto For Five Soloists And Orchestra	S.P.P.T. Chałturnik / Polish Radio Jazz Studio Orchestra	live in studio, compilation / decompilation of previously released material	Poljazz / ANEX 312
1976		Drums Dream	Czesław Bartkowski		Polskie Nagrania Muza SX 1419
1976	2004	Anthology, Vol. 05	SBB	live in studio	Metal Mind Productions
1976		Rodina	Edward Vesala, Tomasz Szukalski, Tomasz Stańko, Juhani Aaltonen, Pekka Poyry and others		Love Records LRLP 189
1976		Satu	Edward Vesala, Tomasz Szukalski, Palle Mikkelborg, Terje Rypdal, Palle Danielsson, Tomasz Stańko, Juhani Aaltonen and others		ECM 1088
1976	1978	Live at Remont	Tomasz Stańko - Edward Vesala Quartet	live	Helicon HR 1002
1977		Love Chant	Jan Wallgren - Bengt Ernryd Quartet		Dragon
1978	1979	Almost Green	Tomasz Stańko, Tomasz Szukalski, Palle Danielsson, Edward Vesala	live in studio	Leo 008
1978		Jasmine Lady	Zbigniew Namysłowski		Polskie Nagrania Muza
1978	1979; 2009	The Quartet	The Quartet	live in studio	Poljazz Z-SX 0688; Anex AN 302
1979		Loaded	The Quartet	live in studio	
1979		Swing Party	Krzysztof Sadowski		Polskie Nagrania Muza SX 1796
1979		Neitsytmatka (Maiden Voyage)	Edward Vesala, Tomasz Szukalski, Sławomir Kulpowicz, Paweł Jarzębski, Tomasz Stańko		Polarvox LJLP 1014
1977-1979	2012	The Quartet	The Quartet	previously unrealised 1977-1979 Polish Radio live sessions and a 1979 concert at National Philharmonic in Warsaw	Polskie Radio 1246–47
1980		Józefina (Josephine)	Józef Skrzek		WiFon LP 037
1981		Wojna Światów: następne stulecie; (War of the Worlds: Next Century)	Józef Skrzek, Tomasz Szukalski, Robert Gola, Janusz Ziomber, Jan Skrzek		Polskie Nagrania Muza SX 2342
1981		Ambitus Extended	Józef Skrzek & Tomasz Szukalski		Helicon HR 1006
1981		Wojna Światów - Live (War of the Worlds - Live)	Józef Skrzek Formation	live in Czechoslovakia	Wydawnictwo 21 21.014
1981		Kolędy (Carols)	Józef Skrzek & Tomasz Szukalski	old Polish X-mas carols single 45 RPM	Helicon HR 001
1982		Matko, która nas znasz...	Stanisław Sojka feat. Tomasz Szukalski	live in studio	Helicon HR 1009
1983		Kolędy (Carols)	Józef Skrzek & Tomasz Szukalski	old Polish X-mas carols single 45 RPM	Helicon HR 002
1984		Ewa Bem Loves The Beatles	Ewa Bem	Polish Jazz Vol.84 Deluxe	Polskie Nagrania Muza
1984		Time Killers	Wojciech Karolak - Tomasz Szukalski - Czesław Bartkowski	Polish Jazz Vol.89 Deluxe	Helicon HR 1012
1985		Tina Kamila	Tomasz Szukalski	for daughter	Polskie Nagrania Muza SX 2250
1986		Tina Blues	Tomasz Szukalski Quartet	live	Poljazz PSJ 172, Wipe 7084
1986		Interjazz 5	Milan Svoboda & The Polish - Czech Big Band	live in studio	Supraphon
1986		Music from Poland at MIDEM '86	various artists		Polskie Nagrania Muza SX 2292
1987		Polish Jazz Vol. 1			Wipe 7081
1987	1987	Sen szaleńca (A Fool's Dream)	Tadeusz Nalepa		Polskie Nagrania Muza 2437
1983-1988	1988	Radioaktywny (Radioactive)	Stanisław Sojka		Polskie Nagrania Muza SX 2661
1988		Sunrise Sunset	Grażyna Auguścik		Polskie Nagrania Muza SX 2615
1989		Mulatu Astatke Plays Ethio-Jazz	Mulatu Astatke		Poljazz PSJ 252
1989		Blues Duo SZ - SZ / Sz-Sz Blues	Tomasz Szukalski - Janusz Szprot	live in studio	Wipe 7079
1989		Borżomski Wąwóz / Body And Soul	Jazz Chorał & Tomasz Szukalski Quartet	with a band from Georgia	Polskie Nagrania Muza
1991		Absolutnie (Absolutely)	Tadeusz Nalepa		Polskie Nagrania Muza SX 3011
1991		Body and Soul	Tomasz Szukalski Quartet	live	Polonia Records CD 003
1993	1994	A Farewell to Maria	Tomasz Stańko		GOWI Records CDG 12
1994	1994	Balladyna: Theatre Play Compositions	Tomasz Stańko		GOWI Records CDG 16
1997		Gadające Drzewo (Talking Tree)	Stół Pański feat. Tomasz Szukalski, Sławomir Kulpowicz & Andrzej Przybielski		ZBIG Records 001
1975-1998	1998	Selected Recordings (:rarum XVII)	Tomasz Stańko	compilation	ECM Records 8017
1999		Lady Walking	Artur Dutkiewicz		Universal Music Polska 546070–2
1999		Escape	Piotr Wojtasik Quintet		
1999	2004	Anthology, Vol. 14	SBB	live	Metal Mind Productions
2000	2001	Reinkarnasja	Grzegorz Karnas		Not Two
2000		Phone Consultations	Tomasz Szukalski, Wojciech Karolak, Jarosław Śmietana Quartet		
2000		Barefoot	Anna Maria Jopek		EmArcy 016 299–2
2000		O co tyle milczenia (Why So Much Silence [Unspokenness])	Anna Maria Jopek		Universal Music Polska
2001		Grechuta	Wojciech Majewski Quintet		Sony Music Polska
1999-2002	2003	Made in Poland [ Presented in Ukraine	Tomasz Stańko Quartet, Jarek Śmietana / Tomasz Szukalski Quartet	excerpts from live performances in Ukraine	Lemma – 03011-12/2
2002		My Lullaby	Agnieszka Skrzypek alias Aga Zaryan		Not Two/ Cosmopolis MW 737-2
2003	2018	Zamyślenie (Contemplation)	Wojciech Majewski Quintet		Sony Music Polska
2003	2003	Live in Warsaw (Skarpa Theatre)	Karin Krog & Tomasz Szukalski Quartet	live 50 copies for invited guests of the Embassy of Norway in Poland	Mariusz Zych & Embassy of Norway in Poland
2004		Sny (Dreams)	Grzegorz Karnas		DeBies 002
2005		O Panie przebacz mej myśli, że nie dość jeszcze Miłuję	Józef Skrzek	compilation	
2005	2006	Wolność w sierpniu (Freedom in August)	Tomasz Stańko, Tomasz Szukalski, Marcin Wasilewski, Apostolis Anthimos, Sławomir Kurkiewicz, Michał Miśkiewicz, Janusz Skowron	contribution for the Warsaw Uprising Museum	FIRe 001
2005		Session Natural Irish & Jazz	Carrantuohill		Celt / Rockers Publishing CC08
2005		The Best of Polish Jazz 2005			
	2009	Opowieść (A Story)	Wojciech Majewski Quintet		4EVERMUSIC 130
1978-2006	2012	Sławomir Kulpowicz - Complete Edition	Sławomir Kulpowicz, In-Formation, The Quartet, Sławomir Kulpowicz & Shujaat Khan	5-CD box	
1981-2007	2010	The Day of The Jackal	Tomasz Szukalski, Apostolis Anthimos, Arild Andersen, Andrzej Cudzich, Artur Dutkiewicz, Paweł Jarzębski, Kazimierz Jonkisz, Sławomir Kulpowicz, Józef Skrzek, Janusz Stefański, Zbigniew Wiatr	live compilation 100 copies contributed to support the "Dzień Szakala" benefit	Mariusz Zych limited private edition
	2011	The Masters of Polish Jazz	Piotr Wojtasik		
