= Śmietana =

Śmietana is a surname. Notable people with the surname include:

- Alicja Smietana (born 1983). Polish violinist, viola player, arranger, and composer
- Jarek Śmietana (1951–2013), Polish jazz musician, father of Alicja

== See also ==
- Smetana (dairy product)
