= Karolak =

Karolak is a Polish surname. Notable people with the surname include:

- Stanisław Karolak (1931–2009) – Polish romanist and slavist
- Wojciech Karolak (1939–2021) – Polish jazzman
- Czesław Karolak (born 1946) – Polish Germanist
- Tomasz Karolak (born 1971) – Polish actor and vocalist
