= Alicja Smietana =

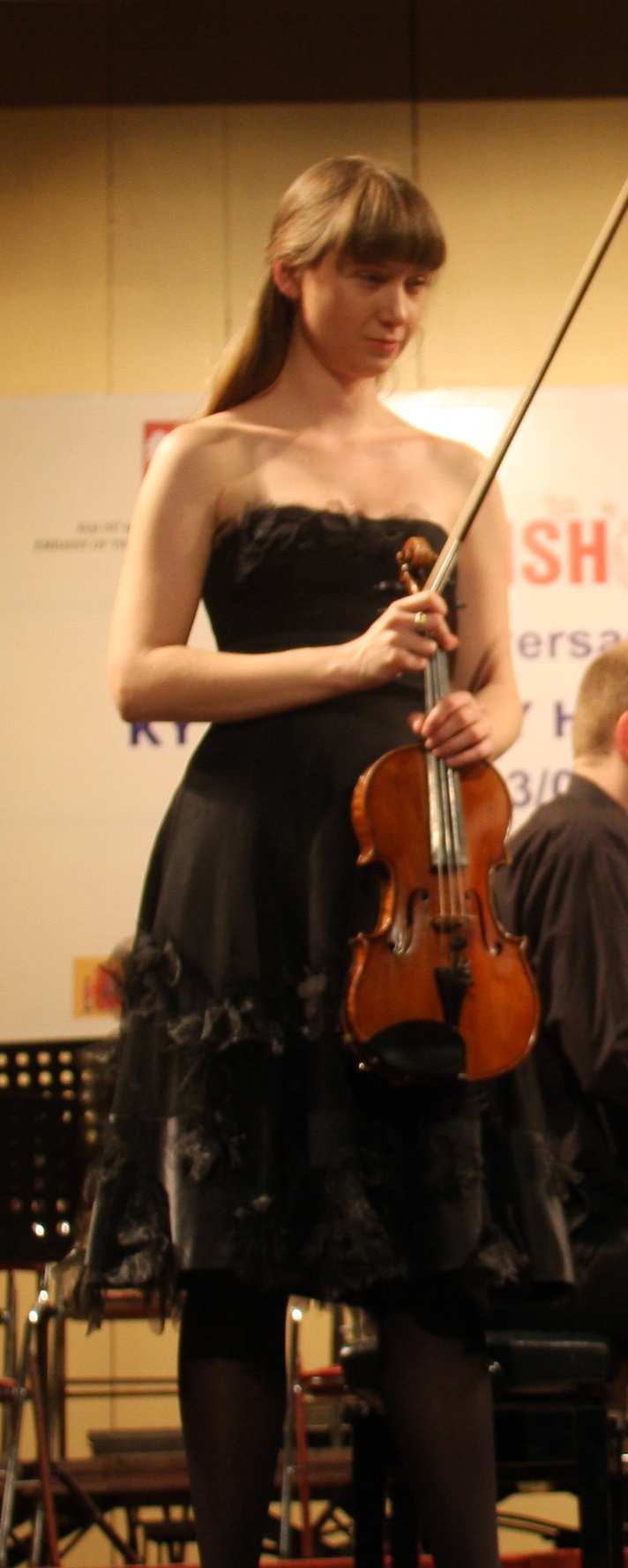

Background information
- Born: 9 August 1983 (age 41); Kraków, Poland
- Genres: Classical, jazz
- Occupation(s): Violinist, violist
- Instrument(s): Violin, viola
- Website: www.alicjasmietana.com

Alicja Smietana (born 9 August 1983) is a Polish-British violinist, viola player, arranger and composer.

== Education ==
Coming from a musical family (her father is jazz guitarist Jarek Śmietana) she started playing the violin at the age of 5 studying under Leszek Skrobacki and later Bogdan Wozniak. She then moved on to study at the Academy of Music in Kraków with Mieczysław Szlezer and later joined the Guildhall School of Music and Drama to study with David Takeno and Ofer Falk. She also studied viola with Sven Arne Tepl.

In 2009 she joined Kronberg Academy's Young Soloists (Further Masters), where she studied with Christian Tetzlaff.

== Career ==
Winner of numerous competitions and awards she was quickly recognized as one of the most interesting violinists of the young generation. In 2002 she was invited to play with Kremerata Baltica - a chamber orchestra led by Gidon Kremer which gave her opportunity to work closely with worlds finest musicians. Since then she has played with Kremerata Baltica on number of other occasions. As a soloist she made her international debut performing a Mozart concerto under direction of Sir Neville Marriner with the Academy of St Martin in the Fields.

She has performed as a soloist and chamber musician together with Nigel Kennedy, Gidon Kremer, Yuri Bashmet, Martha Argerich, Ivan Monighetti, Boris Pergamenshikov and others. Attending many international masterclasses she received artistic guidance from many musicians including Hagai Shaham, Dorothy DeLay, Ana Chumachenco, Tabea Zimmermann, Michael Frischenshlager, Erich Gruenberg, Zakhar Bron, Boris Garlitsky, Zvi Zeitlin and Itzhak Perlman. In 2008 She was asked by Nigel Kennedy to help him create, direct and manage his Orchestra of Life. She is also a director of Extra Sounds Ensemble since 2013.

She has played concerts and recitals in major venues all over the world including recent appearances at the Royal Albert Hall, Royal Festival Hall and Berlin Philharmonic.

She is very keen on improvisation and is also performing a lot of experimental music, jazz and contemporary electronic music in venues such as the 100 Club, the Vortex and Ronnie Scotts among others. She has performed with Quincy Jones orchestra and Quincy Jones himself and other artists such as Wojciech Karolak, Adam Czerwiński, Jan Ptaszyn Wróblewski, John Etheridge, Krzesimir Dębski, Gwilym Simcock and many others.

Alicja is also an arranger and has received multiple awards and grants towards that side of her career.

She plays a 1740 Camillo Camilli violin and a Jean Pierre Marie Persois bow.

She is a member of Mensa with IQ 156.

== Partial discography ==
- Alicja Smietana & Aleksandra Łaptaś "Lutosławski & Previn" (2004) JRS
- Jarek Smietana "Story of Polish Jazz" (2004) JRS
- Jarek Smietana "Autumn Suite" (2006) JRS
- Jarek Smietana "Revolution" (2008) KRS
- Nigel Kennedy & Orchestra of Life "Four Elements" (2011) (Sony Classical)
- Alicja Smietana & Evelyne Berezovsky "Works by Bach, Gould, Previn, Pärt" (2012) Solo Musica
- Alicja Smietana & Extra Sounds Ensemble "Friends - Music of Jarek Smietana" (2014) AC Records
- Alicja Smietana, Extra Sounds Ensemble and Pekka Kuusisto "Metamorphoses" (2015) Solo Musica
- Alicja Smietana & Extra Sounds Ensemble "Friends - Music of Jarek Smietana" (Album by Adam Czerwiński) - VINYL edition (2015) Ac Records
- Nigel Kennedy & Orchestra of Life "The New Four Seasons" (2015) Sony Classical
- Nigel Kennedy "Kennedy Meets Gershwin" (2018) Warner Music
