= Seant =

Seant (Polish Jazz Vol. 11)

Studio album by Andrzej Trzaskowski Sextet featuring Ted Curson
- Released: 1966
- Recorded: December 1965 - 1966
- Genre: Jazz
- Length: 49:19
- Label: Polskie Nagrania

Polish Jazz Series chronology
| Vol. 10 - Winners Of The Festival "Jazz On The Odra River" (1966) | Seant (Polish Jazz Vol. 11) (1966) | Hagaw - The Jazz Band Jeunesses Musicales de Pologne "Pro musica" (1967) |

Professional ratings
Review scores
| Source | Rating |
|---|---|
| Diapazon | not rated link (in polish) |

Seant is a studio album by Andrzej Trzaskowski Sextet released on Polskie Nagrania in 1966 as Polish Jazz series volume 11. Album features American jazz trumpeter Ted Curson. The album is regarded by Jazz Forum as one of the most significant compositions of Polish jazz.

== Track listing ==
Side A:

1. "Seant" (Andrzej Trzaskowski) - 9:58
2. "Wariacja na temat "Oj tam u boru" (Variation on the theme "Near The Forest") (Trzaskowski) - 6:36
3. "The Quibble" (Trzaskowski) - 7:58

Side B:

1. "Cosinusoida" (Trzaskowski) - 24:47

== Personnel ==
- Ted Curson - trumpet
- Włodzimierz Nahorny - alto saxophone
- Janusz Muniak - soprano saxophone
- Andrzej Trzaskowski - piano
- Jacek Ostaszewski - bass
- Adam Jędrzejowski - drums
