= Balladyna (album) =

Studio album by Tomasz Stańko
- Released: April 1976
- Recorded: December 1975
- Studios: Tonstudio Bauer; Ludwigsburg, W. Germany
- Genre: Jazz
- Length: 41:01
- Label: ECM 1071 ST
- Producer: Manfred Eicher

Tomasz Stańko chronology
| Twet (1974) | Balladyna (1976) | Almost Green (1978) |

Balladyna is an album by Polish jazz trumpeter and composer Tomasz Stańko recorded in December 1975 and released on ECM in April the following year. The quartet features saxophonist Tomasz Szukalski and rhythm section Dave Holland and Edward Vesala.

== Reception ==
The AllMusic review by Michael G. Nastos awarded the album 3½ stars stating "as pleasant as it is to listen to all the way through, it is equally satisfying, and lies deep within the souls of these four adroit and accomplished musicians playing together as one."

Professional ratings
Review scores
| Source | Rating |
|---|---|
| AllMusic | 3.5/5 stars |
| The Penguin Guide to Jazz Recordings | 3.5/4 stars |

== Track listing ==
All tracks are written by Tomasz Stańko except as noted.

Side I
| No. | Title | Writer(s) | Length |
|---|---|---|---|
| 1. | "First Song" | | 7:42 |
| 2. | "Tale" | Dave Holland; Tomasz Stańko; Edward Vesala | 3:32 |
| 3. | "Num" | Vesala | 7:15 |
| 4. | "Duet" | Holland; Stańko | 2:58 |
| Total length: | | | 21:27 |

Side II
| No. | Title | Length |
|---|---|---|
| 1. | "Balladyna" | 8:01 |
| 2. | "Last Song" | 6:04 |
| 3. | "Nenaliina" | 5:29 |
| Total length: | | 19:34 41:01 |

== Personnel ==
- Tomasz Stańko – trumpet
- Tomasz Szukalski – tenor saxophone, soprano saxophone
- Dave Holland – bass
- Edward Vesala – drums
