= List of Polish jazz groups =

A list of Polish jazz groups:

- Big Band Akademi Muzycznej w Katowicach
- The Cracow Klezmer Band
- Hagaw
- Jazz Darings
- June
- Kury
- Light Coorporation
- Melomani
- Mikrokolektyw
- Miłość
- Niechec
- Skalpel
- Tie Break
- Voo Voo
- Marcin Olak Trio
