= Anna Serafińska =

Polish singer (born 1974)

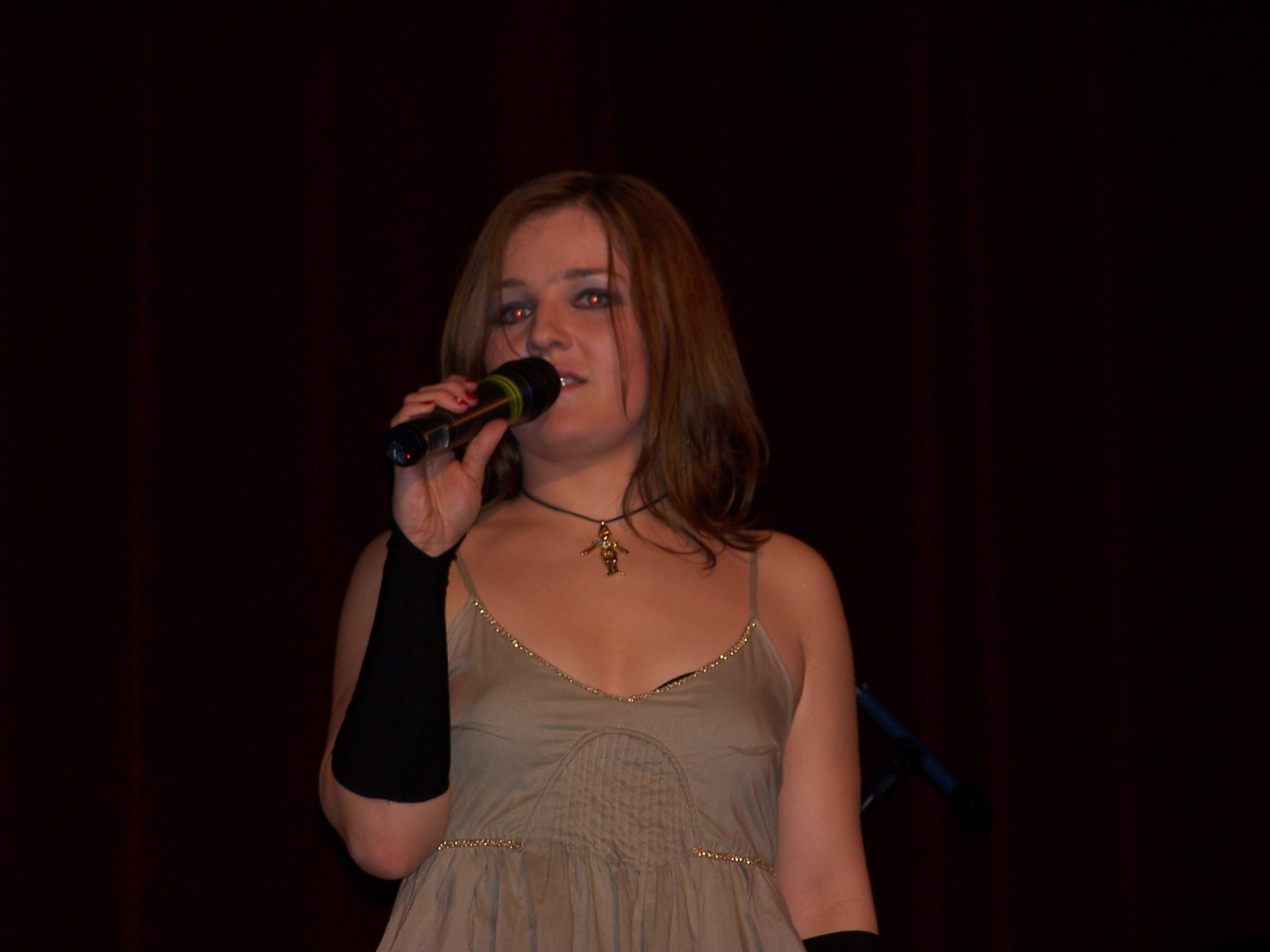
- Serafińska in 2006
- Born: 9 November 1974 (age 51); Sosnowiec, Poland
- Occupations: Jazz singer; Academic teacher
- Organizations: Aleksander Zelwerowicz National Academy of Dramatic Art

Anna Serafińska (born 9 November 1974) is a Polish jazz singer and academic teacher at the Aleksander Zelwerowicz National Academy of Dramatic Art in Warsaw.

== Life and career ==
Serafińska is a granddaughter of the jazz singer Carmen Moreno and the saxophonist and band leader Jan Walasek. She attended the music gymnasium in Katowice, where she focused on violin. She then studied jazz and pop at the Karol Szymanowski Academy of Music there. She became an assistant of the academy for a voice class in 1997. She graduated with a dissertation about singing in 2004.

In 1996 Serafińska was a choir member for Kasia Kowalska's entry at the Eurovision Song Contest 1996 in Oslo. She released her first album the following year, Nieobecni, of songs to texts by Jonasz Kofta. She released several more albums, and she participated in an album Singing Jazz of her grandmother in 2011. She has also worked as a coach for voice and as a director in film-synchronisation.

In 2008 Serafińska was appointed assistant professor at the Aleksander Zelwerowicz National Academy of Dramatic Art in Warsaw, serving as deputy dean from 2012 to 2013. She has served as deputy rector responsible for academic personal from 2000.

== Awards ==
Serafińska received several awards, including at the 2004 Shure Montreux Jazz Competition young jazz vocalists of the Montreux Jazz Festival.

== Recordings ==
- Nieobecni (PolyGram Polska, Mercury 1997)
- Melodies (Sony 1999)
- Ciepło, zimno (Radio Polska 2004, with Robert Majewski, Artur Dutkiewicz, and Marek Napiórkowski, among others)
- Gadu Gadu (EMI 2006, with Krzysztof Herdzin among others)
- Maria Sadowska, Anna Serafińska, Janusz Szrom: Kaczmarski & Jazz 2010
- Groove Machine (EMI 2013, with Rafał Stępień, Andrzej Gondek, Michał Barański, Cezary Konrad, Ola Nowak, and Kasia Dereń)
- Chopin Trio (Arthorse 2017, with Stępień and Konrad)
