= Carmen Moreno (singer) =

Polish singer (1926–2025)

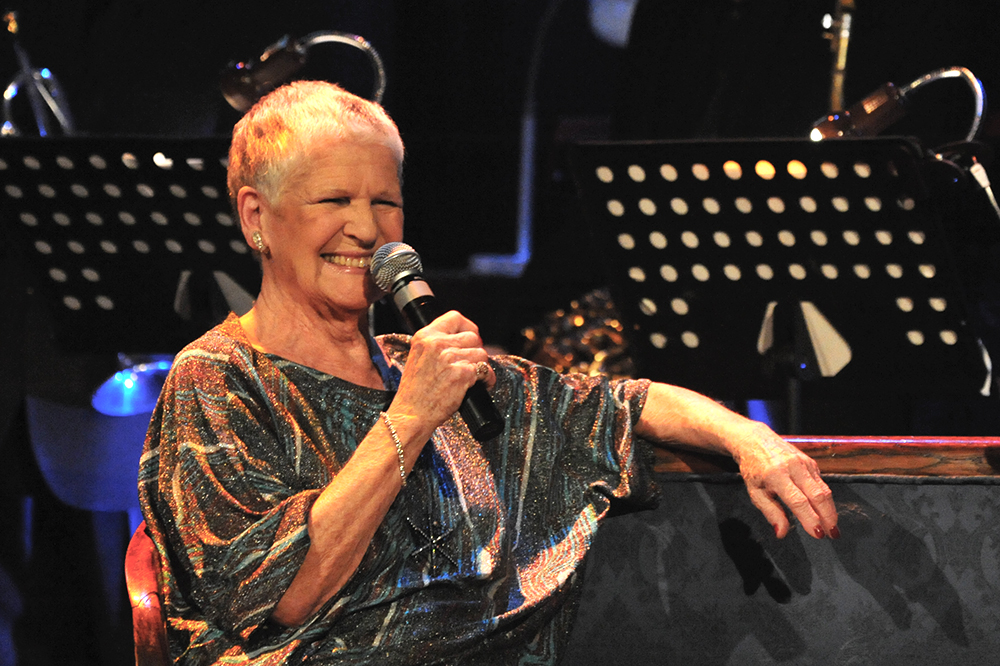
- Moreno performing in 2010
- Born: 30 July 1926; Altona, Hamburg, Germany
- Died: 11 November 2025 (aged 99)
- Occupations: Jazz singer, dancer

Carmen Moreno (30 July 1926 – 11 November 2025) was a Polish jazz singer and dancer. She was a pioneering jazz vocalist in the emerging jazz scene of Poland, joining Melomani, the first jazz group in Poland, in 1951 and then performing with Zygmunt Wichary's jazz orchestra. She joined Błękitny Jazz, performing with them in 1956 at the Congress Hall in Warsaw and on tour in the Soviet Union. She toured in Europe with Jan Walasek who became her husband in 1967. They moved to Scandinavia and performed as artists on luxury passenger ships. They returned to Poland in 1981. She appeared in a show, Śpiewając Jazz, from 2009. Moreno was described as the "Swinging Queen of Polish Jazz."

== Life and career ==
Moreno was born in Altona (now part of Hamburg), on 30 July 1926, the daughter of a Pole, Józef Masłowski, and a Spaniard, Paulina Moreno. Her parents met in Paris in the 1920s. Her father was a dancer, and her mother an acrobatic dancer; they performed together as the stage duo Los Morenos, with whom Carmen made her own stage debut as a child. The family performed successfully in Berlin, Paris, and Vienna. In January 1945, they arrived in Mysłowice, where her father later died under unclear circumstances.

In 1951, she began performing with Melomani, the first jazz group in Poland. In 1954, she became a soloist with Zygmunt Wichary's jazz orchestra. In October 1955, she appeared with the orchestra at the Jazz Tournament in Warsaw, and on 12 November 1955 performed at Studio 55 concerts, organized by Leopold Tyrmand. She later joined the jazz orchestra Błękitny Jazz led by Ryszard Damrosz, with whom she performed in February 1956 at the Congress Hall in Warsaw, and toured the Soviet Union in August the same year.

In July 1958, Moreno won first place at the inaugural Jazz Festival held at the Népstadion in Budapest, which won her international recognition. She toured Poland and abroad with various ensembles of Jan Walasek. She performed in Hungary, the GDR, the Soviet Union, Czechoslovakia, Bulgaria, Norway, Denmark, Finland, and Sweden. In December 1967, she married Walasek, and they moved to Scandinavia. For many years, Moreno and Walasek performed as artists on luxury passenger ships of the Norwegian–American Line (NAL).

In 1981, they returned to Poland for vacation, but the imposition of martial law prevented their return abroad. She continued performing for decades. In 1989, Moreno and Walasek performed with Stanisław Fiałkowski's Big Band at the 26th National Festival of Polish Song in Opole, where Moreno received the title Miss Obiektywu (Miss Lens, a title for the festival's most photogenic performer.).

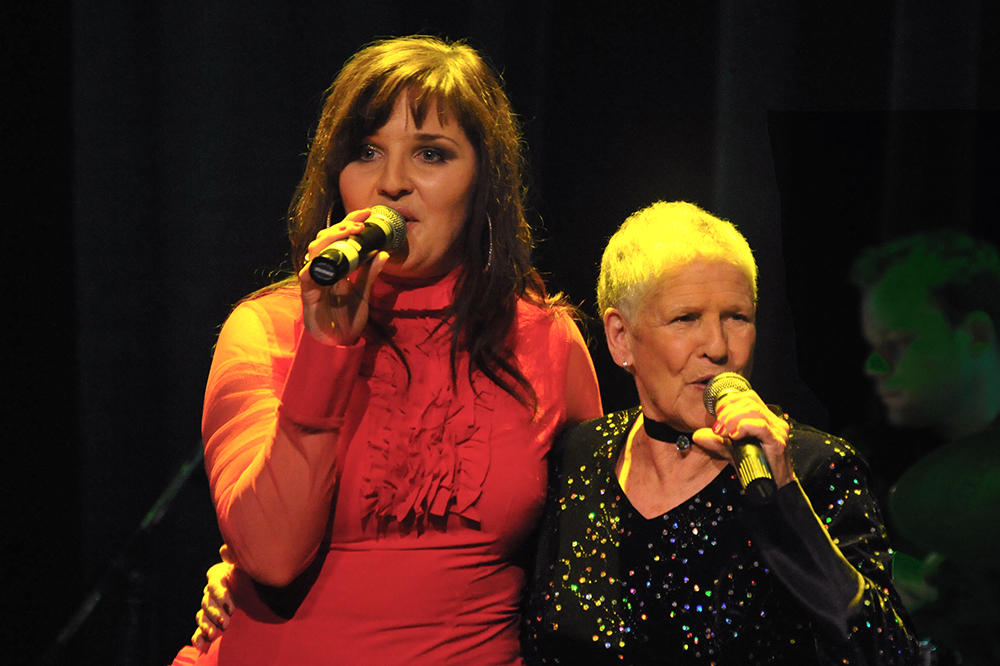
Moreno (r.) performing with Anna Serafińska in 2010

In 2009, a theatrical production titled Śpiewając jazz (Singing Jazz) directed by Zbigniew Dzięgiel was staged in Warsaw and in Ostrowiec Świętokrzyski, the hometown of Jan Walasek. She performed with her granddaughter, Anna Serafińska, at the Warsaw Jazz Jamboree in 2010. In 2016, at the initiative of the Ladies' Jazz Festival organizers, a gala concert celebrating Moreno's 90th birthday was held at the Music Theatre in Gdynia.

Moreno recorded only a few tracks for Polskie Nagrania, and for Polish Radio and a radio station in Oslo. In 2009, her first CD, Carmen Moreno – Śpiewający Jazz, was released, containing archival recordings and material recorded during the 2009 stage production.

=== Personal life ===
Moreno's second husband was musician Jan Walasek. Her granddaughter was jazz singer Anna Serafińska.

Moreno died on 11 November 2025, at the age of 99.

== Discography ==
=== Albums ===
- Carmen Moreno: Śpiewając jazz (4ever MUSIC, 2009, CD; featuring Anna Serafińska and Maciej Zakościelny) OCLC 839034290

=== EPs / singles ===
- Elisabeth Charles & Zespół Jazzowy Zygmunta Wicharego / Carmen Moreno & Zespół Jazzowy Jana Walaska: Georgia; Słoneczny dzień / St. Louis Blues; Triste Rapsodia (Pronit PN N 0138; 1960) OCLC 864399532

== Gallery ==
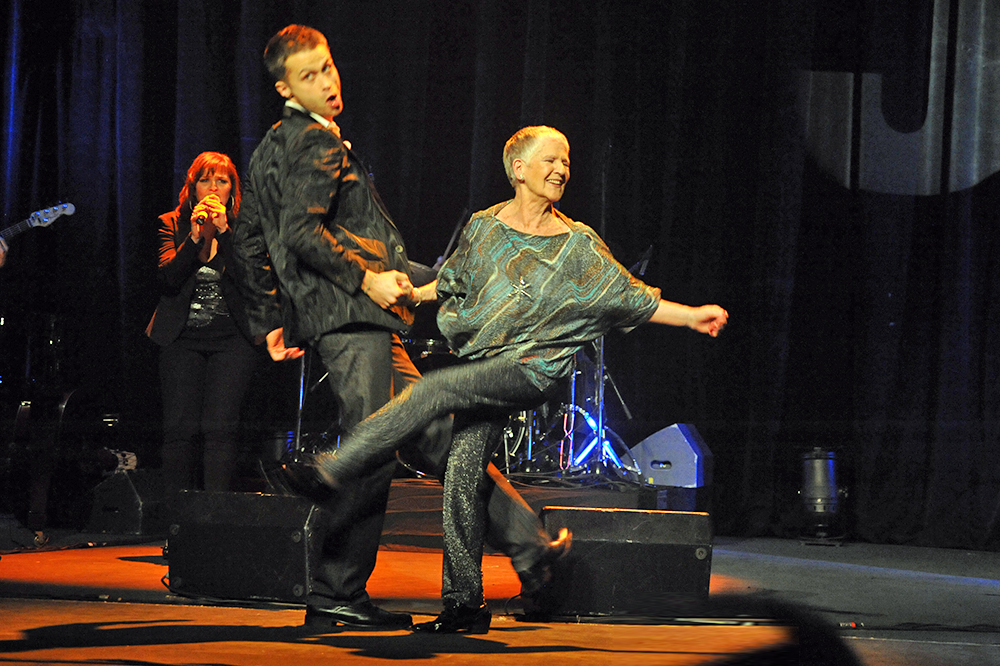
On stage with Maciej Zakościelny.

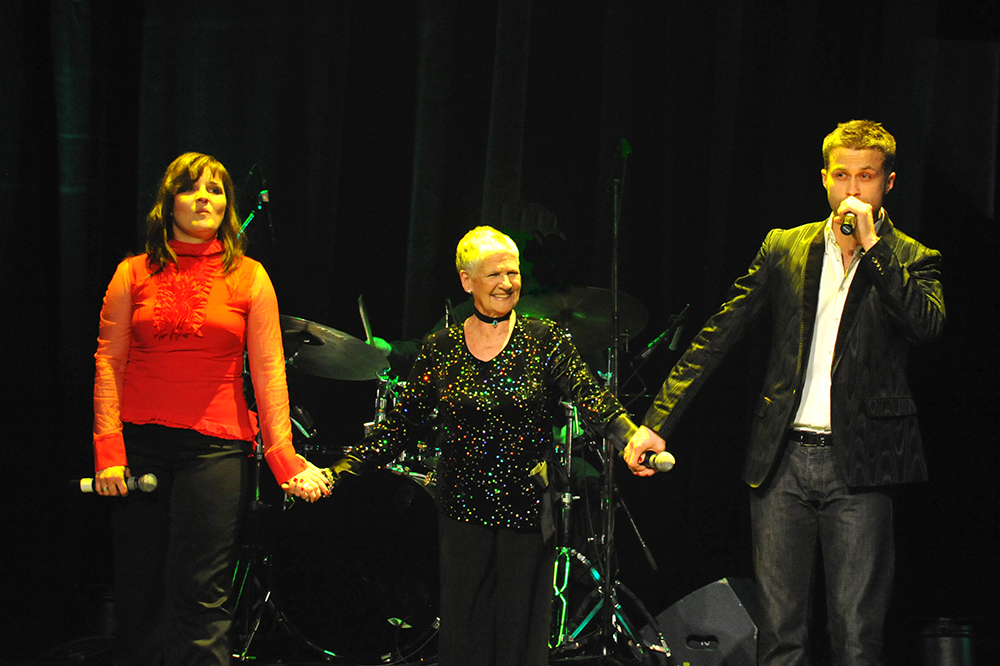
Performance of Śpiewając Jazz. Polish Theatre, Warsaw, November 2010.
