= Grzegorz Karnas =

Polish jazz vocalist, music producer, linguist, photographer and blogger

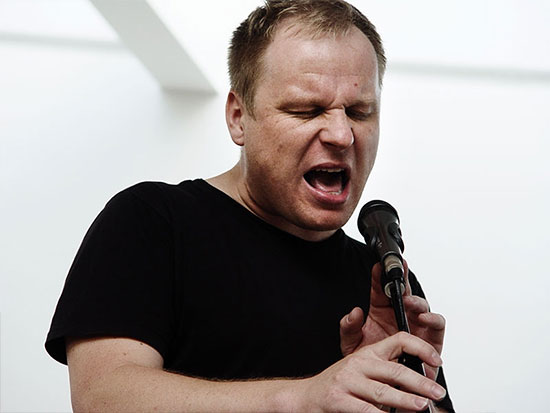
Karnas in 2014

Grzegorz Karnas (born 1972) is a Polish jazz vocalist, music producer, linguist, photographer and blogger.

== Biography ==
Karnas was born in Wodzisław Śląski, Poland. He comes from a family without academic traditions of any kind. During his high school education he finished one year of classical guitar at the Szafrankowie Brothers State School of Music in Rybnik. He also spent eight years studying French, English and Arab languages, literatures and cultures at University of Mikołaj Kopernik in Toruń, English Teacher Training College in Cieszyn and Jagiellonian University in Kraków. Karnas is a graduate and a former teacher of the Jazz Institute of the Academy of Music in Katowice, considered prestigious in Poland.

Throughout his career he has worked with top-line artists of European jazz scene as well as some of its legends. In 1998, he was awarded first prize at the International Jazz Vocalists' Meeting in Zamość (Poland). The following year, his debut album "Reinkarnasja" (Not Two 2000) was released and put Karnas on the road touring at main jazz clubs and festivals in Poland and Slovakia. Summer of 2004 saw the premiere of Grzegorz Karnas' self-produced solo project "Sny/Dreams of a Ninth Floor" (DeBies). Its promotion took place with a series of club and festival concerts in Poland, Slovakia, Czech Republic, Germany and Romania. His composition "Dreams" featured on a compilation CD called "The Best of Polish Jazz 2005". A new album "Ballads for the End of the World" featuring a Silesian cello player Adam Oleś was released in April 2006. Promotions of both projects continued in 2007. In 2006 Karnas was awarded first prize at Young Jazz Singers Competition Brussels. In August 2007 he was a winner of Crest Jazz Vocal competition held yearly in Crest in southeastern France. His album under the title "Karnas" was released in 2011 by a Slovak label Hevhetia and his live performances from Budapest were produced and released by a Hungarian label BMC Records as "Audio Beads" (2012) and "Vanga" (2014) making Karnas a distinctive element of European jazz vocal scene. A live album called "Power Kiss" (Hevhetia 2017) was recorded during Karnas Formula's Chinese Tour in 2016.

Apart from performing Karnas occasionally lectures on improvisation. He conducted workshops in Poland, Germany, France, Czech Republic, Belgium, Denmark, Luxembourg, Slovakia, Hungary, Ukraine, Russia, Uzbekistan, China, Malaysia and Indonesia.

Karnas is the spiritus movens and the artistic director of the Voicingers Festival - his brain child born in 2008.

== Prizes ==
- 2nd prize at the Jazz Standards Festival in Siedlce, Poland, 1998 (as No Offence)
- 1st prize at the International Jazz Vocalists' Meeting in Zamość, Poland, 1998
- 1st prize at Young Jazz Singers Competition Bruselles, Belgium, 2006
- 1st prize at Crest Jazz Vocal competition, Crest, France, 2007
- 1st prize at Pink Lady Food Photographer Of The Year (the category Politics Of Food), London, Great Britain, 2018

== Discography ==
- 2000 — «Reinkarnasja» (Not Two) with Tomasz Szukalski, Sławomir Kurkiewicz and Piotr Wyleżoł
- 2004 — «Sny» (DeBies) with Tomasz Szukalski, Robert Kubiszyn, Michał Tokaj, Sebastian Frankiewicz
- 2006 — «Ballady na Koniec Świata» (Ninth Floor Production) with Adam Oleś, Radosław Nowicki, Tomasz Kałwak
- 2011 — «Karnas» (Hevhetia) with Michał Tokaj, Sebastian Frankiewicz, Michał Jaros and Adam Oleś
- 2012 — «Audio Beads» (BMC Records) with Miklós Lukács, Michał Miśkiewicz and Adam Oleś
- 2014 — «Vanga» (BMC Records) with Miklós Lukács, Sebastian Frankiewicz and Michał Jaros
- 2017 — «Power Kiss» (Hevhetia) with Elchin Shirinov, Alan Wykpisz and Grzegorz Masłowski

Featuring Grzegorz Karnas

- 2008 — Yvonne Sanchez «My Graden» (Warner music)
- 2012 — Jazz City Choir «Jazz City Choir»
- 2012 — Jihye Lee «Goblin Bee (Hevhetia)»
- 2012 — Maria Guraievska «Water Nymphs» uncredited guitar solo (Hevhetia)
- 2012 — Edilson Sanchez «Domingo» (Hevhetia)
