= Kazimierz Jonkisz =

Polish jazz drummer (born 1948)

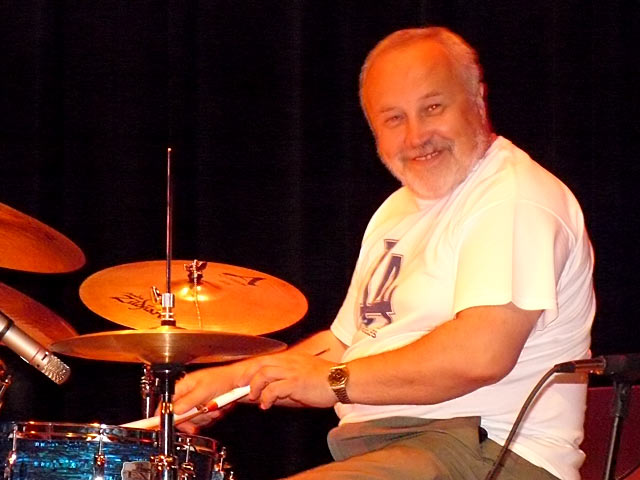
Kazimierz Jonkisz in 2007

Kazimierz Jonkisz (born 1948 in Wilamowice) is a Polish jazz drummer.

Jonkisz's musical education began at age 10 with accordion lessons at his high school. Later, he switched to drums at the Bielsko-Biała Music High School. He appeared at the "Jazz by the Odra '67" Festival at 18, winning it as a soloist. In 1971, he graduated from the Academy of Music in Katowice, receiving the Krzysztof Komeda Award.

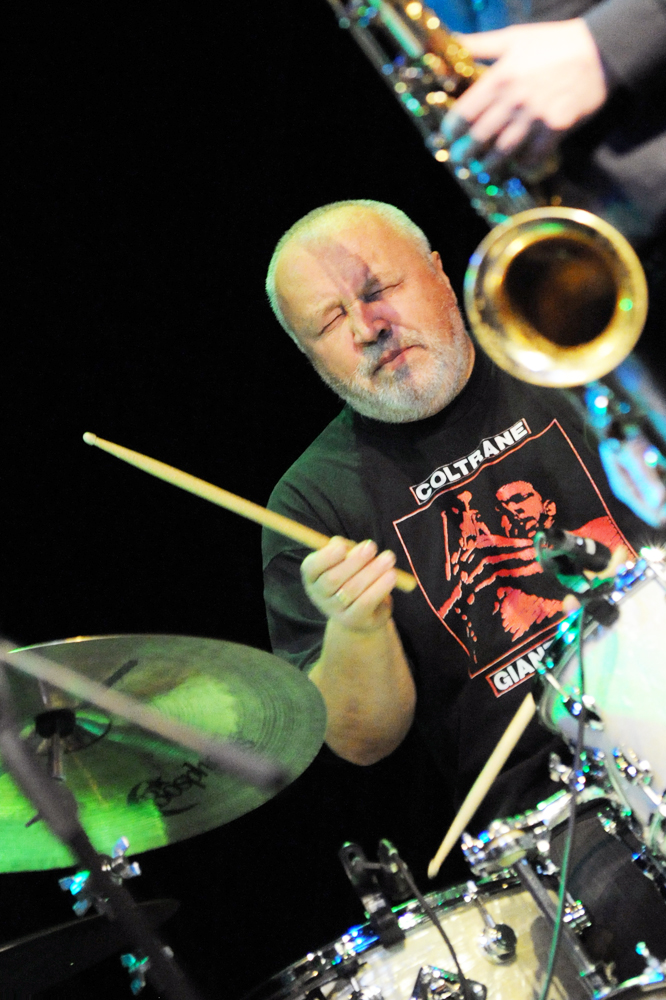
During a benefit concert for Tomasz Szukalski in November 2010 in Warszawa

He has worked and recorded with Polish jazz musicians such as: Tomasz Stańko, Zbigniew Namysłowski, Adam Makowicz, Jan "Ptaszyn" Wróblewski, Michał Urbaniak and Mieczysław Kosz. He has played with American jazz musicians such as Al Cohn, Roy Hargrove, Larry Coryell, Amina Claudine Myers, Monty Waters, Eddie Henderson, Kevin Mahogany, John Hicks, Bob Sheppard, Larry Goldings, and Tim Hagans.

Since 1978, he has led his groups in which many Polish jazz musicians made their professional debut. He has recorded over 70 records, some of them as a leader (the first one "Tiri Taka", was made in 1980). He played at festivals in Poland and Europe, such as: Jazz Jamboree, Molde Jazz Festival, Bergamo, Ost West - Germany, Havana Jazz, New Port in Belgrade, Temecula International Jazz Festival (USA), and many others. For 15 years, he has taught drums at the jazz department of the Fryderyk Chopin Music Academy in Warsaw. Along with teachers from Berklee College of Music and Musik Hoch Schule from Graz, he regularly teaches drums at the summer jazz workshop in Puławy, Poland.
