= Janusz Szrom =

Polish jazz vocalist and composer (born 1968)

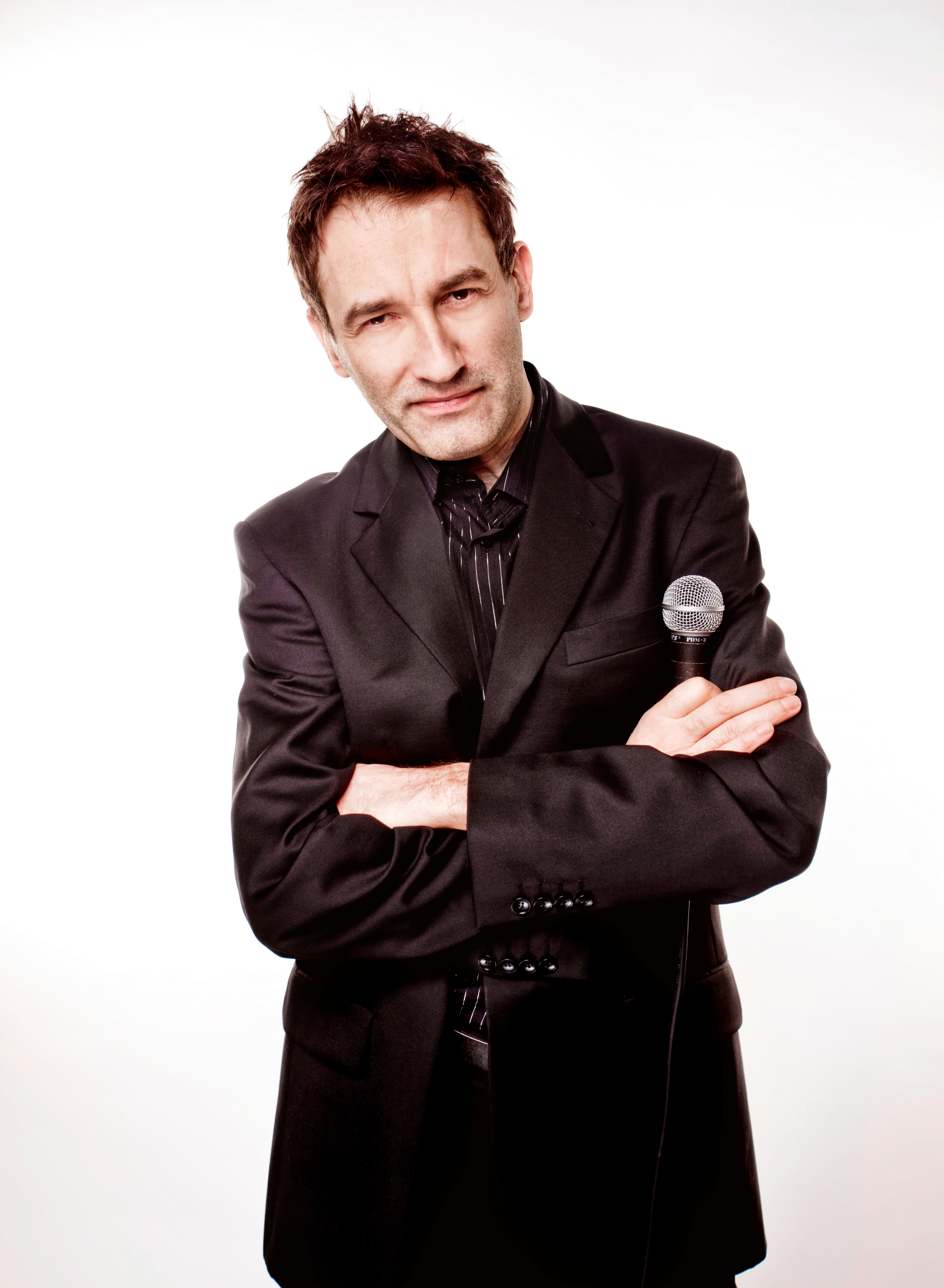
Janusz Szrom, 2010

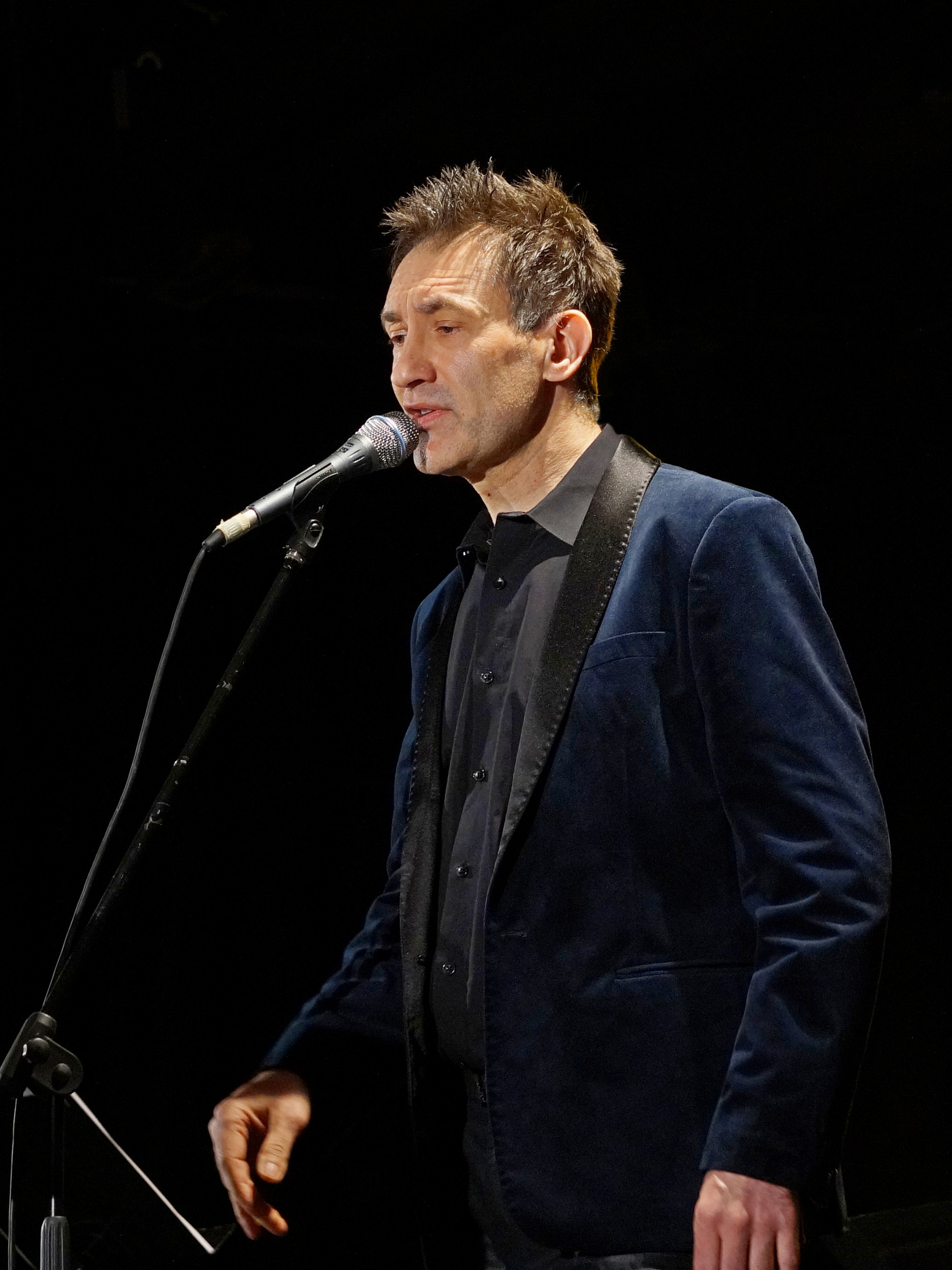
Janusz Szrom, Warsaw 2014

Janusz Szrom in concert, Warsaw, 27.12.2014

Janusz Szrom (born 16 November 1968 in Grodków) is a Polish jazz vocalist and composer.

== Biography ==
His musical education started in 1977 on the piano, at Nysa School of Music. Then, in 1981, he started to play on trumpet while continuing to perfect the piano skills, in Chrzanów School of Music. In 1989, after graduating from the Secondary School of Music in Kraków, majoring in trumpet (minor in piano), he first entered John Paul II University to play organ and later (in 1990) matriculated to Musical University in Kraków to study music theory. Finally, in 1992 he began study in Katowice at the prestigious Karol Szymanowski Academy of Music's School of Jazz and Popular Music. In 1995, he received his master's degree with Honors as a Jazz Vocalist. In January 2012, he received PhD degree from the Fryderyk Chopin University of Music in Warsaw. In June 2014, he completed the process of habilitation at the Fryderyk Chopin University of Music in Warsaw, gaining the rank of a "habilitated doctor,"- equivalent to the American title of "assistant-professor." The title of his work was "Polska piosenka popularna interpretowana w języku jazzowym. Analiza utworów z płyty ŚPIEWNIK." ("Polish pop music translated into the language of jazz. An analysis of the works from "Śpiewnik.")

His career as a jazz vocalist started in 1994, when he won the 2nd place honor at the International Meeting of Jazz Vocalists in Zamość. Next year, in 1995 – he was the first prizewinner of the publicity prize at the Fall Pomeranian Jazz- "Key to Career’s Door", which is one of the most important honors for a young artist to achieve. Since then he has performed at numerous festivals and music meetings, as Jazz nad Odrą, Jazz Jamboree, Old Jazz Meeting "Złota Tarka" in Iława, Jazz Standard Festival in Siedlce, Jazz Muzeum in Ostrów Wielkopolski, National Festival of Polish Song in Opole and International Meetings of Jazz Vocalists in Zamość.

In 2008, Janusz Szrom was selected by Michel Legrand to perform his famous What are you doing the rest of your life song during the Legrand’s concert at the prestigious 50th Jubilee Jazz Jamboree festival in Warsaw. Jazz Vocalist of the Year in Poland for the years of 2009, 2010, 2011, 2012 2013 and 2014 elected by the readers of the "Jazz Forum" magazine.

Except from active performing, he also has a great experience as a composer, arranger, and teacher. He teaches vocal class at Fryderyk Chopin's College of Music in Warsaw, at Aleksander Zelwerowicz's Theater Academy in Warsaw and at the Academy of Music in Poznań. Also, he has worked for many years as the teacher and instructor of famous Summer Workshops of Jazz Music in Puławy and Chodzież. Janusz Szrom holds the position of the Artistic Director for the Polish-Ukrainian Musical Workshop at Lwow. In addition to appearances on various TV shows and in radio programs such as Kabaret Olgi Lipińskiej (Olga Lipińska Cabaret), Irena Kwiatkowska and Her Guests and others, he has also served as acting teacher in TV programs like Star Academy or Jak Oni Śpiewają.

He took part in two music theatre performances: in 1999, at Ateneum Theatre, Warsaw, in the play inspired by Jonasz Kofta’s lyrics - Kofta (directed by Artur Barciś), co-starring with Joanna Trzepiecińska; and in 2008, at the Centralny Basen Artystyczny, in the play based on the greatest songs of polish 19th century great composer Stanisław Moniuszko, rearranged by greatest contemporary composers like Włodzimierz Nahorny or Andrzej Jagodziński - Moniuszkowo (directed by Barbara Dziekan).

Janusz Szrom is also an author of the music project called Straszni Panowie Trzej. It happens to be a first jazz arrangement of the songs from the unforgettable Older Gentelmen Cabaret, written by Jerzy Wasowski and Jeremi Przybora. In 2009, two of his albums: "Straszni Panowie Trzej" and „Talk with me” has acquired a Gold Record Awards. A board member of the PSJ (Polish Jazz Society) since 2009.

== Medals ==
- 2013 – Medal for Merit to Culture – Gloria Artis

== Discography ==
- "Jazzowe poetycje" - Jacek i Wojtek Niedzielowie, Koch International 1996
- "I Love Gershwin" - Danuta Błażejczyk, Jazz Forum Records 1998
- "Szeptem" - Anna Maria Jopek, Mercury/PolyGram, 1998
- "SODA", Koch International 1998
- "Gniew" - muzyka do filmu Marcina Ziębińskiego, Koch International 1998
- "Opole'99" - piosenki pochodzące z koncertu Premier 36 Krajowego Festiwalu Piosenki Polskiej "Opole '99"
- "Jazz w polsce-Antologia, 1950-200" - (Pierwsza antologia jazzu w Polsce), Polskie Radio SA 2002
- "Duke po polsku" - Wojciech Młynarski & Zbig’s Band: Futurex 2002
- "Historia roku minionego" - Jacek Niedziela, Megaus WA Records 2002
- "Kofta na bis-różni wykonawcy" - (Piosenki Jonasza Kofty), Warner Music Poland 2002
- "To Miłość Mi Wszystko Wyjaśniła" - Duszpasterstwo Środowisk Twórczych i Sportu Diecezji Warszawsko-Praskiej 2005
- "The Best of Polish Smooth Jazz vol.2" - Polonia Records 2006
- "Nieszpory – Artyści Polscy Janowi Pawłowi II w Hołdzie" - Stowarzyszenie Miłośników Muzyki Chrześcijańskiej Gospel / Polskie Radio SA 2006
- "Straszni Panowie Trzej" - (Piosenki z Kabaretu Starszych Panów), AGORA 2006
- "GITANA - electric, eclectic" - GITANA 2007
- "Cicho, cicho pastuszkowie" - Kolędy Włodzimierza Nahornego i Bogdana Loebla / BLUE NOTE 2007
- "Piosenki Jonasza Kofty" - (Zapis koncertu w radiowej "Trójce" 5.06.2002) / gazeta RZECZPOSPOLITA 2007
- "Strofki o miłości" - (Zapis koncertu w radiowej "Trójce" 12.03.2006) / gazeta RZECZPOSPOLITA 2007
- "Hymny - Artyści Janowi Pawłowi II w Hołdzie" - Stowarzyszenie Miłośników Muzyki Chrześcijańskiej Gospel 2008
- "Cafe Fogg" - (Piosenki Mieczysława Fogga), Sony BMG 2008
- "Przy Sercu Twoim" - (Kantata Maryjna Zbigniewa Małkowicza), Zbigniew Małkowicz 2008
- "Polish Jazz 2007" - (Sześciopłytowy box zawierający perełki jazzowe polskich gwiazd), Polonia Records 2008
- "Pogadaj ze mną" - (Piosenki Wojciecha Młynarskiego i Włodzimierza Nahornego), AGORA 2008
- "Patroni Europy i Polski - Artyści Janowi Pawłowi II w Hołdzie" - Stowarzyszenie Miłośników Muzyki Chrześcijańskiej Gospel / Polskie Radio SA 2009
- "Ewa Uryga - Jedno spojrzenie" - Grami Records 2009
- "Mazurek" - (Książka dla dzieci i płyta CD o Fryderyku Chopinie), Mazowieckie Centrum Kultury i Sztuki 2010
- "Vibraslap" - (Pierwszy autorski album grupy Vibraslap, LUNA 2010
- "Kaczmarski & Jazz" - (Piosenki Jacka Kaczmarskiego w jazzowych interpretacjach Marii Sadowskiej, Anna Serafińska i Janusza Szroma), QM MUSIC 2010
- "Młynarski, żyj kolorowo" - (seria: „Poeci Polskiej Piosenki), Universal Music Group 2011
- "Przybora - Piosenka jest dobra na wszystko" - (seria: „Poeci Polskiej Piosenki), Universal Music Group 2011
- "Fabryka Kolęd" - (Album grupy wokalnej Voice Factory), Wratislavia Productions 2011
- "The Engineers Band. Kolędy" - (Album Big Bandu Politechniki Warszawskiej), Engineers Band 2011
- "Osiecka o miłości" - ( Various Artists ), Universal Music Polska 2012
- "Twoje Niebo - dzień po dniu" - Wydawnictwo Karmelitów Bosych 2012
- "Śpiewnik" - (Janusz Szrom / Zbigniew Wrombel), Studio Realizacji Myśli Twórczych 2012
- "Duke po polsku. Live, Jazz Jamboree 2001" - (Wojciech Młynarski / Zbigniew Jaremko & Zbig's Band), Airtech, Polskie Radio 2013
- "Ballady i niuanse" - Polskie Radio 2013
- "Straszni Panowie Trzej 2" - (Piosenki z Kabaretu Starszych Panów) - Blue Note 2014
- "Sześć oceanów" - (100 utworów zarejestrowanych w latach 1962 – 2013. Różni wykonawcy) Polskie Radio 2014
- "Gram o wszystko" - ...a "Hollywood" tribute to Jerzy Wasowski, 2015
- "65 lat polskiej piosenki" - (Antologia polskiej piosenki powojennej. Różni wykonawcy) Polskie Radio 2014
- "Five o'clock Orchestra. Jubilee. Feat. Janusz Szrom" - Polskie Stowarzyszenie Jazzu tradycyjnego 2015
- "Dixie Brotherhood. Feat. Janusz Szrom. TRAIN TO NEW ORLEANS" - Dixie Brotherhood 2015
- "Sześć oceanów. Ocean Popielaty" - (pierwszy z "Sześciu oceanów" Agnieszki Osieckiej) Polskie Radio 2015
- "Sześć oceanów. Ocean Różowy" - (drugi z "Sześciu oceanów" Agnieszki Osieckiej) Polskie Radio 2015
- "Faceci do wzięcia" - (Janusz Szrom & Bogdan Hołownia) Studio Realizacji Myśli Twórczej 2016
- "Pamiętajmy o Osieckiej" - Kolekcja Okularników" Magic Records 2016
- "Tryumfy Króla Niebieskiego" (Różni wykonawcy), Bartosz Hadała 2016
- "Kolędy i pastorałki" (Józef Eliasz i Eljazz Big-band. Anna Serafińska i Janusz Szrom), Eljazz 2016
- "Zaczarowana miłość" (Piosenki Leona Sęka. Wykonawcy różni), Soliton 2016
- "Janusz Szrom. Inaczej" (Piosenki Jerzego Jarosława Dobrzyńskiego), J.Szrom 2016
- "Wojciech Majewski. nie było lata" (Na motywach poezji Stanisława Grochowiaka), MTJ 2017
- "Frank Sinatra. 100-lecie urodzin. Koncert" (Koncerty w Trójce), Polskie Radio 2017
