= Wojciech Karolak =

Polish jazz musician (1939–2021)

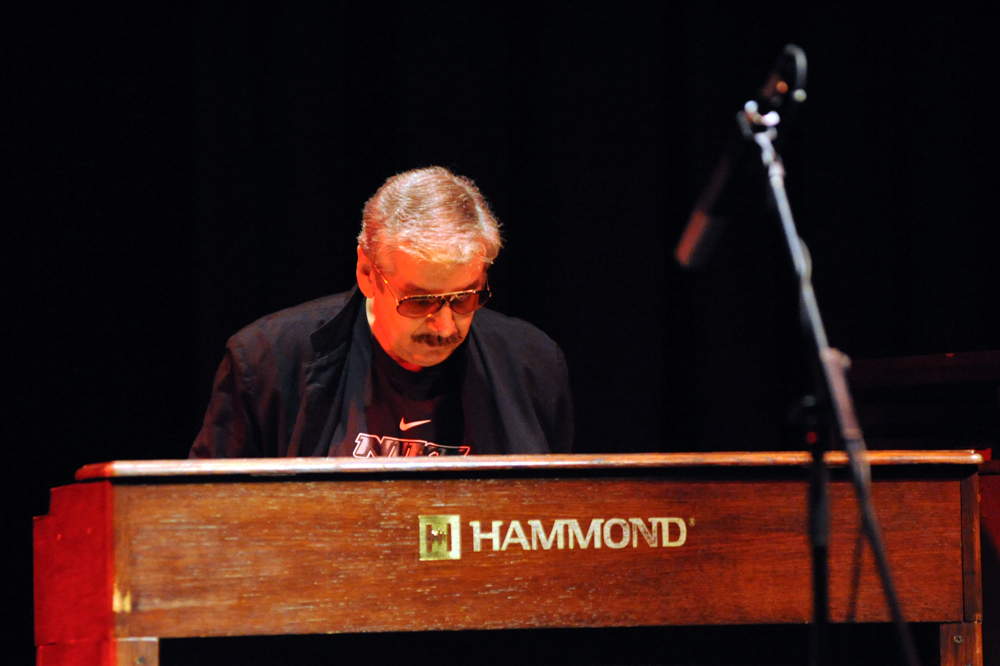
Wojciech Karolak performing at a benefit concert in Warsaw, Poland in November 2010

Wojciech Krzysztof (Wojtek) Karolak (28 May 1939 – 23 June 2021) was a Hammond B-3 organist who referred to himself as "an American jazz and rhythm and blues musician, born by mistake in Middle Europe". He also played saxophone and piano professionally.

Karolak was born Warsaw, Poland. In 1958, he began performing with the band the 'Jazz Believers' playing alto saxophone. The Jazz Believers consisted of the pianists Andrzej Trzaskowski and Krzysztof Komeda, Trafika Dżajant, and multi-instrumentalist Jan "Ptaszyn" Wróblewski.

Next, Wojciech Karolak played tenor saxophone in Andrzej Trzaskowski's The Wreckers. In 1961, Karolak switched from saxophone back to piano. In 1962, he formed his own trio and started recording his own music. This trio became the premier jazz band in Poland and backed most Western/American artists visiting Poland, among them Annie Ross, Ray Charles, and Don Ellis, with whom he recorded. In 1963, he started playing with "Ptaszyn" Wróblewski's Polish Jazz Quartet. The same year, Karolak recorded a quintet album with leader Andrzej Kurylewicz (trumpet) and Wróblewski (tenor sax/flute) entitled called Go Right.

In 1965, Karolak left Poland for Sweden where he lived until 1972. He began to play the Hammond organ only in 1967 and, after hearing Chick Corea, took up the Fender Rhodes electric piano in 1970.

He played rock and blues in music clubs in order to, in his own words, "make enough money to buy an apartment and a Hammond B-3", which he eventually bought in 1973. From then on, Karolak spent more time composing and arranging though he did continue to collaborate and perform with others. He performed with violinist Michał Urbaniak jazz-rock group after his return to Poland, and toured Europe during 1973 and 1974, and worked in trios with Zbigniew Namysłowski and Czesław Bartkowski in the same period. While in Western Europe he also played with Red Mitchell, Putte Wickman, Leroy Lowe and others. He then returned to Poland and co-led the group Mainstream and worked as a composer-arranger for the Polish Radio Studio Jazz Orchestra.

In the winter of 1976, he participated in the "Radost '76" jazz workshops in Mąchocice near Kielce, which were immortalized in the documentary "Gramy Standard" directed by Andrzej Wasylewski.

In the 1980s, he established, with Tomasz Szukalski and Czeslaw Bartkowski, a "superformation": 'Time Killers'. The resulting recording was voted the best Polish jazz record of the decade.

From the 1990s, Karolak played with the guitarist Jarosław Śmietana (admired by Pat Metheny among others), and recorded three records with him. With Piotr Baron and Zbigniew Lewandowski, Karolak started The High Bred Jazz Trio. He played in numerous concerts with Leszek Cichoński's Guitar Workshop and continued to write, arrange, and perform in Poland and abroad.

Polish President Aleksander Kwaśniewski awarded him the Knight's Cross of the Order of Polonia Restituta, Poland's second highest civilian honor after the Order of the White Eagle.

== Music for films ==
- 1981: Filip z konopi – music, conductor
- 1981: Konopielka – music
- 1983: Bardzo spokojna wieś – music
- 1983: Szczęśliwy brzeg – music, performance
- 1984: Miłość z listy przebojów – music, conductor
- 1985: Przyłbice i kaptury – music, performance
- 1991: Niech żyje miłość – performance
