= Andrzej Trzaskowski =

Polish composer and jazz musician

- Andrzej Trzaskowski at the 1965 Jamboree jazz festival.

Background information
- Born: 23 March 1933; Kraków, Poland
- Died: 16 September 1998 (aged 65) Warsaw, Poland
- Genres: Jazz; bebop; Free jazz
- Occupations: Musician; composer
- Instrument: Piano

Andrzej Trzaskowski (23 March 1933 – 16 September 1998) was a Polish jazz musician, composer and musicologist. From the mid-1950s onward, he was regarded as an authority on syncopated music.

== Biography ==
=== Early life and education ===
Andrzej Trzaskowski was born in Kraków on 23 March 1933. He began playing piano at age four and founded his first jazz band, Rhythm Quartet. He attended Jan III Sobieski High School in Kraków and collaborated with prominent Polish jazz pianists. His paternal grandfather, Bronisław Trzaskowski, established some of the first girls' secondary schools in Poland.

In the autumn of 1950, Trzaskowski was detained by the Polish Ministry of Public Security and imprisoned for 3 months, suspected of belonging to the underground group Pomorska. Despite having passed his final exams cum laude, he was not admitted to Jagiellonian University due to "serious conflicts with the authorities" and was advised to wait one year before reapplying. For several months, Trzaskowski earned his living by playing in night clubs of Kraków, Łódź and Zakopane. In the summer of 1952, he performed in the band Melomani together with Krzysztof Trzciński in Ustronie Morskie.

Trzaskowski was eventually admitted to the Department of History and Theory of Music of Jagiellonian University. In parallel, he learned new composing techniques and music analysis with Bogusław Schaeffer and Eugeniusz Rudnik at the Polish Radio Experimental Studio. Trzaskowski received his master's degree in 1957 after a thesis on the music of American jazz saxophonist Charlie Parker.

=== Career ===
In 1956, Melomani performed at the Jazz Festival of Sopot, and Trzaskowski was recognized the same year as the best jazz pianist by a Przekrój poll. From 1958, he played together with Jan Ptaszyn Wróblewski in the band Jazz Believers, which performed at the Jamboree music festival. In 1959, Trzaskowski moved permanently to Warsaw, when he soon established his own band, The Wreckers, also composed of Alojzy Musiał, Wojciech Karolak, Roman Dyląg and Andrzej Dąbrowski. The band drew inspiration from the music of Charlie Parker, Dizzy Gillespie, and hard bop, while Trzaskowski modelled on Horace Silver's pianism. The Wreckers debuted at Jamboree 1959. They expanded the following year to include Zbigniew Namysłowski, and performed at the National Philharmonic of Warsaw. At Jamboree 1960, the Trzaskowski's Trio accompanied American jazz saxophonist Stan Getz, and they recorded together the album Stan Getz & Andrzej Trzaskowski Trio in October 1960. At Jamboree 1961, Trzaskowski's Trio and Getz performed with British jazz saxophonist Ronnie Ross.

At the end of the 1950s, Trzaskowski began working with Polish cinema, arranging and recording music for the film Night Train (1959) by Jerzy Kawalerowicz. He composed or created soundtracks for films including Zuzanna and Chłopcy (1961), Ich dzień powszedni (1963), Rozwodów nie będzie (1963), Lekarstwo na miłość (1965), or Walkower (1965). He also appeared on the screen, playing piano in Andrzej Wajda's Innocent Sorcerers (1960) and Feliks Falk's Był jazz (1981).

In June 1962, Trzaskowski moved to the United States with a new composition of The Wreckers: Dąbrowski was replaced by Adam Jędrzejowski, and Karolak by Michał Urbaniak. The band toured at jazz festivals in Washington, Newport or New Orleans, and in venues such as Village Vanguard in New York. The Wreckers also appeared on the popular television program "Who is in the World" and the group received favourable reviews from The New York Times. As the first Polish jazz artists performing in the US, the band branded itself as "Iron Curtain Jazz". Following the American tour, they changed their name to Andrzej Trzaskowski Quintet.

The Andrzej Trzaskowski Quintet performed at Jamboree 1962, where they presented the song Nihil Novi, later performed at the National Philharmonic with American trumpeter Don Ellis. In 1963–1964, the Quintet gave concerts in Germany, Italy, Switzerland, Yugoslavia, East Germany and Belgium. Composed until 1967 of Ted Curson, a former member of the Charlie Mingus formation, the band toured in Germany under the name Sextet Trzaskowski and recorded the album Seant in 1966, regarded by Jazz Forum as one of the most significant compositions of Polish jazz.

By 1963, Trzaskowski began to move away from bop music towards free jazz. In the three-part composition Synopsis (chamber version 1964, orchestral version 1965), he introduced elements of serialism, polymetry, and controlled aleatorism. In the years 1965–1970, Trzaskowski took part in jazz workshops under the patronage of the Norddeutscher Rundfunk radio station in Hamburg, writing around 20 previously unheard songs for the event. In an interview with the station, he said: "I am a dodecaphonist by conviction (...), I try to adapt this technique to the requirements of the jazz language. I would like my songs and my style of pianist-improviser to be based on the achievements of European avant-garde music, without losing their jazz character. "

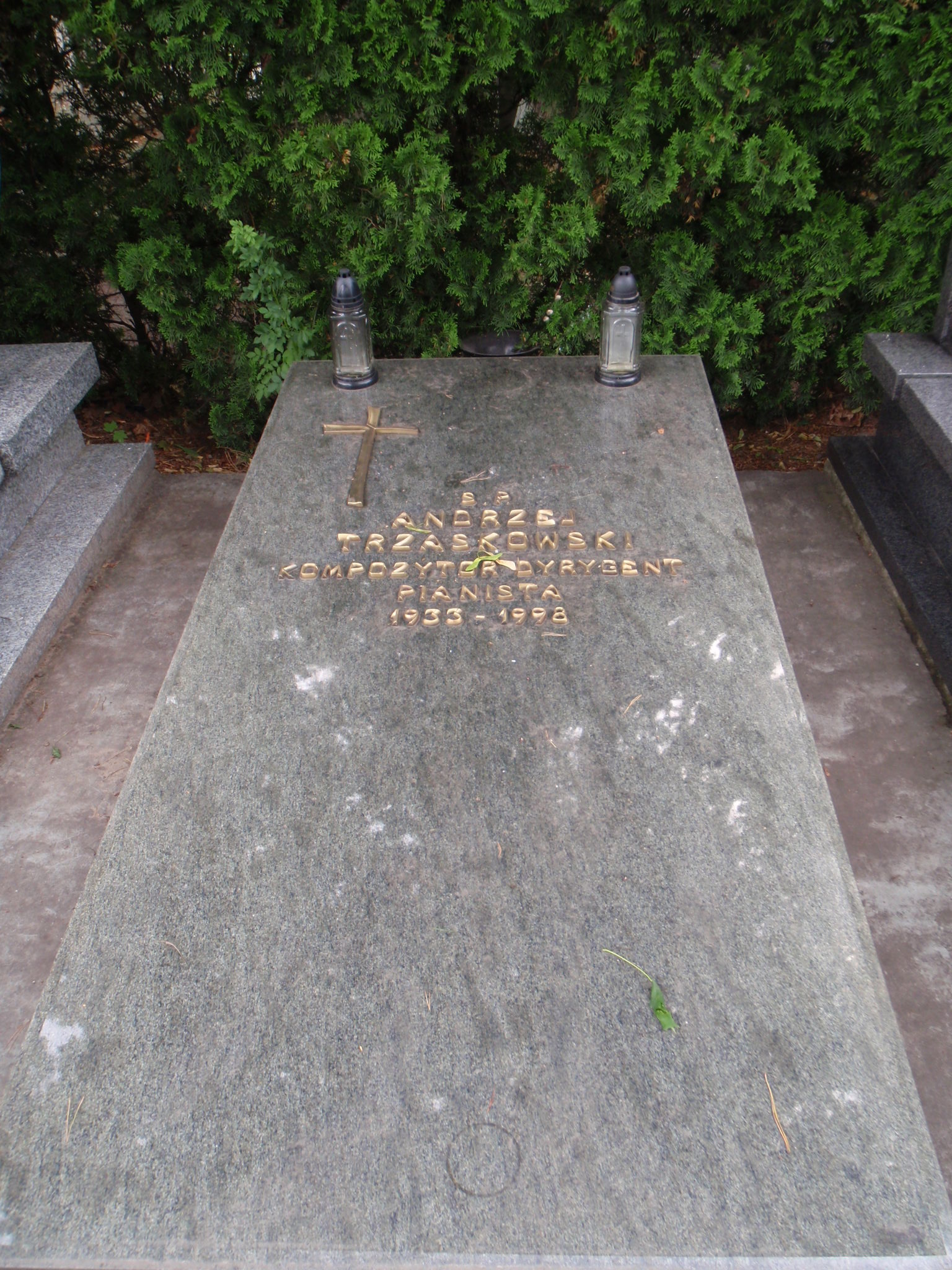
Andrzej Trzaskowski's grave at the Powązki Military Cemetery.

Trzaskowski performed again at Jamboree 1965, 1968 and 1970. In 1972 he won the 3rd prize (the 1st and 2nd were not awarded) in the composition competition of the Radio and TV Committee and the Polish Composers' Union for his ballet music Nihil est. In the years 1971–1974 he performed and recorded at the Polskie Radio Jazz Studio, and became in 1975 the head of Polish Radio Symphony Orchestra Studio S-1.

=== Late life and death ===
From 1992, Trzaskowski lectured at the Jazz Department of the State Music School of Warsaw. During the last years of his life, suffering from a terminal illness, he composed almost exclusively for cinema and television. In 1995, he was awarded the Cross of Merit for his artistic career.

Trzaskowski died in Warsaw on 16 September 1998, aged 65. He is buried at the Powązki Military Cemetery.

== Personal life ==
He was married to Teresa née Arens. She gave birth on 17 January 1972 to the couple's son Rafał Trzaskowski, who has been serving as the mayor of Warsaw since 2018.

== Selected recordings ==
- The Wreckers (1960, Muza 0133)
- Polish Jazz Vol. 4 (1965, Muza 0258)
- Andrzej Trzaskowski Sextet Featuring Ted Curson "Seant" (1966, Muza 0378)
