= Jarek Śmietana =

Polish jazz guitarist, composer, and band leader

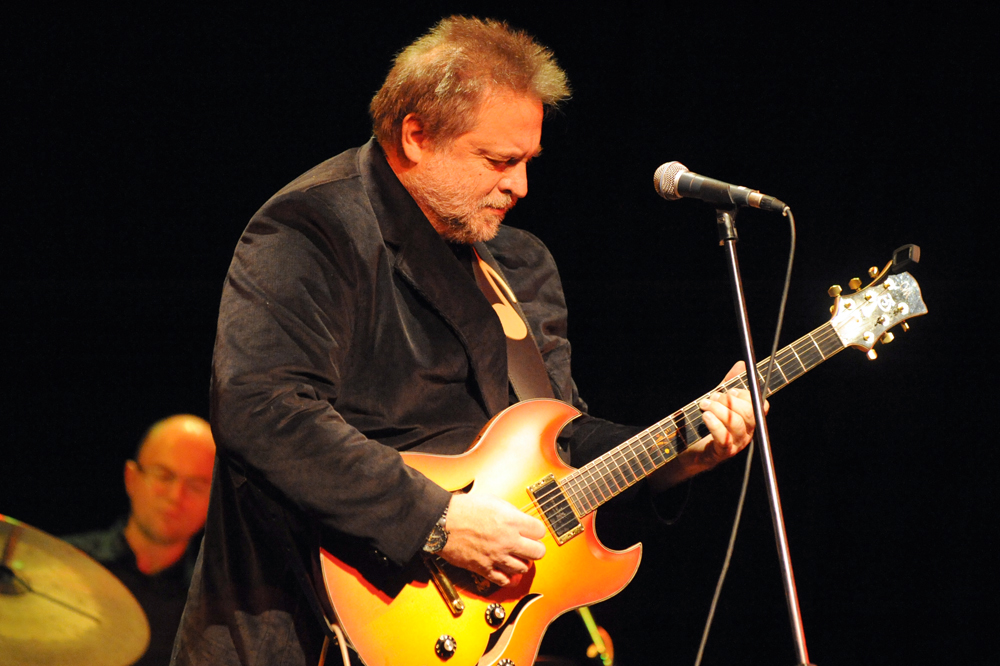

Background information
- Born: Jarosław Śmietana; March 29, 1951; Kraków, Poland
- Died: September 2, 2013 (aged 62) Kraków
- Genres: Jazz
- Occupation: Musician
- Instrument: Guitar

Jarosław "Jarek" Śmietana (29 March 1951 – 2 September 2013) was a Polish jazz guitarist, composer, and band leader.

== Early life and education ==
Śmietana was born in Kraków. He studied at the Karol Szymanowski Academy of Music in Katowice.

== Career ==
Śmietana led the band Extra Ball in 1974. He continued to lead this band until 1981. He was the leader of the Sounds Big Band Symphonic Sound Orchestra, the Polish Jazz Stars Band. He was also a co-leader of the Namysłowski-Śmietana Quartet. He performed at festivals, concert tours, and workshops in the U.S., India, Asia and South America.

During his musical career he played and recorded with Art Farmer, Freddie Hubbard, Eddie Henderson, Vladislav Sendecki, Joe Zawinul, Janusz Muniak, Gary Bartz, Carter Jefferson, Vince Mendoza, John Abercrombie, Hamiet Bluiett, Idris Muhammad, Ronnie Burrage, Harvie Swartz, Mike Stern, Jack Wilkins, Zbigniew Seifert, Cameron Brown, Andy McKee, David Gilmore, and Nigel Kennedy. He recorded more than 25 albums as a band leader.

He was the father of violinist Alicja Smietana. He died in 2013. In 2015, a contest, the International Jarek Śmietana Jazz Guitar Competition was initiated in his memory. It was held in Kraków.

== Awards and honors ==
In 1972, with the blues band Hall, he won an award at the Jazz nad Odrą festival. In 1998 he was the winner of the Fryderyk 1998 award for Songs and Other Ballads. He was presented with the President of Cracow Prize for cultural achievement.

== Discography ==
=== As leader ===
- Talking Guitar (Polskie Nagrania, 1984)
- From One to Four (PolJazz, 1986)
- Sounds with Colours (Polskie Nagrania, 1987)
- Touch of Touch (Polskie Nagrania, 1989)
- Sounds/Colors (Wipe, 1990)
- Ballads and Other Songs (Starling, 1993)
- Quartet (Koch, 1994)
- Phone Consultations with Wojtek Karolak (GOWI, 1996)
- Songs and Other Ballads (Starling, 1997)
- Kind of Life (SelleS, 1998)
- Meeting Point with Cezariusz Gadzina (SelleS, 1998)
- Speak Easy with John Abercrombie (PAO, 1999)
- African Lake with Gary Bartz (Starling, 2000)
- Vis-a-vis with Zbigniew Paleta (JSR, 2002)
- Parallel Worlds (JSR, 2004)
- A Story of Polish Jazz (JSR, 2004 )
- My Love and Inspiration (EMI, 2005)
- Autumn Suite (JSR, 2006)
- What's Going On? with Wojtek Karolak (JSR, 2006)
- Polish Standards with Karolak/Czerwinski (JSR, 2007)
- Grube Ryby with Karolak/Bzyk (Metal Mind 2007)
- Revolution with Wojtek Karolak (JSR, 2008)
- The Good Life with Yaron Stavi, Adam Czerwinsk, Hamiet Bluiett (JSR, 2009)
- Projekt Elblag with Jerry Goodman (Allegro, 2011)
- I Love the Blues with Wojtek Karolak (JSR, 2011)
- Live! At Impart with Bill Neal (JSR, 2012)
