= Zbigniew Namysłowski =

Polish jazz musician (1939–2022)

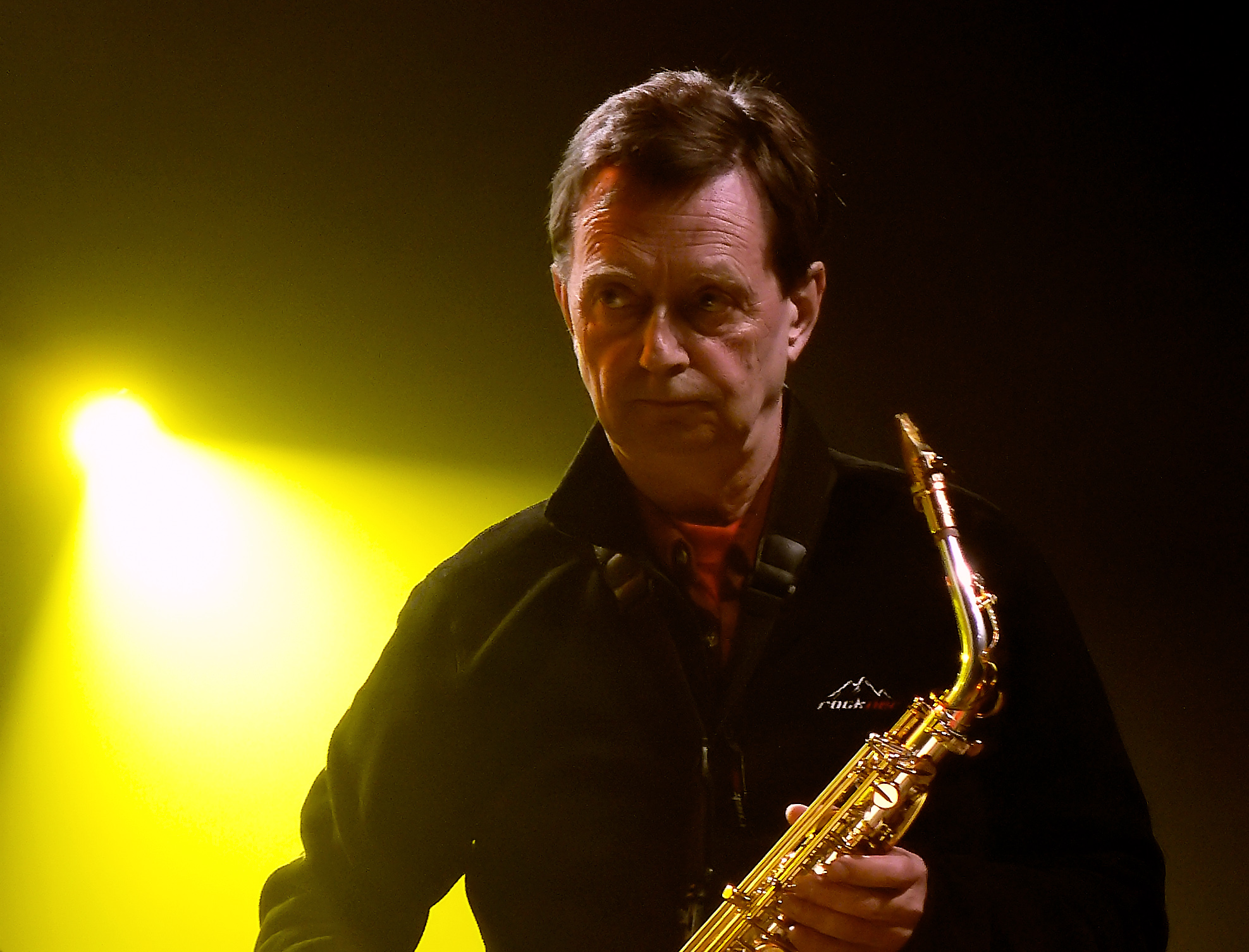
Namysłowski in 2007

Zbigniew Jacek Namysłowski (9 September 1939 – 7 February 2022) was a Polish jazz alto saxophonist, flautist, cellist, trombonist, pianist and composer.

== Life and career ==
Namysłowski was born in Warsaw, Poland, on 9 September 1939. He performed on the Krzysztof Komeda album Astigmatic recorded in 1965. He collaborated with such artists as Janusz Muniak, Leszek Możdżer, Vladislav Sendecki, Michał Urbaniak, and Andrzej Trzaskowski. Namysłowski died on 7 February 2022, at the age of 82.

== Selected discography ==
=== As Leader ===
- 1963 - Jazz Jamboree 63 Vol. 3 - Polskie Nagrania Muza (Zbigniew Namysłowski Quartet)
- 1964.01 – Lola – Decca (1964) (Zbigniew Namysłowski Modern Jazz Quartet)
- 1965.10 – Live at Kosmos, Berlin 1965 – ITM Archives (2008 release) (Zbigniew Namysłowski Quartet)
- 1966.02 – Zbigniew Namyslowski Quartet (Poland Vol. 6) – Polskie Nagrania Muza (1966) (Zbigniew Namysłowski Quartet)
- 1973.02 – Winobranie – Polskie Nagrania Muza (1973) (2003 – Polskie Nagrania Muza)
- 1975.03 – Kuyaviak Goes Funky – Polskie Nagrania Muza (1975) (2004 – Polskie Nagrania Muza) (Zbigniew Namysłowski Quartet)
- 1975 - Geomusic 111 - PL – Polskie Nagrania Muza (1976) (in collaboration with Michael J. Smith and Jacek Bednarek (muzyk) [Jacek Bednarek, the musician])
- 1977.01 – Zbigniew Namyslowski – Polskie Nagrania Muza (1977, later under Warner Bros. Records)
- 1978.03 – Jasmin Lady – Vinyl Records (1979)
- 1979.08 – Future Talk – BVHaast (1979) (1980 – Polish Jazz)
- 1980.08 – Air Condition – Inner City Records (1981) (Air Condition)
- 1984 - Reggae for Zbiggy - Krem [an imprint of Hungaroton] (1985) in collaboration with László Gárdony
- 1987.08 – Open – Polskie Nagrania Muza (1987)
- 1987 – Cy to blues cy nie blues – East Wind Records (1987)
- 1991.03 – Without a Talk – PGP Records (1991)
- 1992.04 – The Last Concert – Polonia Records (1992)
- 1993.11 – Secretly & Confidentially – Koch Jazz (1993)
- 1995.03 – Zbigniew Namysłowski & Zakopane Highlanders – Koch International (1995)
- 1997.04 – Dances – Polonia Records (1997)
- 1998.02 – 3 Nights – Polonia Records (1998)
- 1998.08 – Mozart Goes Jazz – Jazz Forum Records (1998)
- 2000.05 – Jazz & Folk - Namyslowski Quartet & Górale – IPN (2000)
- 2003.03 – Go! – Editio Musica (2003)
- 2003.09 – Standards – Jazz Forum Records (2003)
- 2006.01 – Assymetry – Polish Jazz (2006) (Zbigniew Namysłowski Quintet)
- 2009.02 – Nice & Easy – JB Records (2009)

=== As Sideman ===
- 1965.12 Krzysztof Komeda, Astigmatic – Polskie Nagrania Muza (1966) (2016 – Warner Music Poland) (Krzysztof Komeda Quintet)
- 1968 Novi Quartet and Novi Singers, Novi in Wonderland - SABA (1968)
- 1970 Niemen, Enigmatic - Polskie Nagrania Muza (1970)
- 1970 Studio Jazzowe Polskiego Radia [Jazz Studio Orchestra of Polish Radio]], Jazz Studio Orchestra Of The Polish Radio - Polskie Nagrania Muza (1970)
- 1972 Niebiesko-Czarni, Rock-Opera "Naga I" - Polskie Nagrania Muza (1972)
- 1972 Niebiesko-Czarni, Rock-Opera "Naga II" - Polskie Nagrania Muza (1972
- 1974 S.P.P.T. Chałturnik, S.P.P.T. Chałturnik - Polskie Nagrania Muza (1974)
- 1975 Jazz Jamboree 75 Vol. 2 side-long piece on side two - Polskie Nagrania Muza (1975)
- 1976 S.P.P.T. Chałturnik, Kto Tak Pięknie Gra - Polskie Nagrania Muza (1976)
- 1978 Guido Manusardi Quartet, Namymanu - Atlantic (1978)
- 1980 Maanam, Maanam - Wifon (1980)
- 1980 Jan Ptaszyn Wróblewski Z Lotu Ptaka - appearing on side 2 - Poljazz (1980)
- 1984.11 Laszlo Gardony, Reggae for Zbiggy – Krem (1984) (Laszlo Gardony Quartet)
- 1985 Ryszard Sygitowicz Bez Grawitacji - Wifon (1985)
- 1986 - Hanna Banaszak - Hanna Banaszak - Polskie Nagrania Muza (1986)
- 1989 Ryszard Szeremeta - Constellation - Poljazz (1989)
- 1989 Ryszard Szeremeta - Gwiazdozbiór - Poljazz (1989)
- 1989 Grzegorz Wawrzyszak - On - Pronit (1989)
- 1989 Jarek Śmietana - Touch to Touch - Polskie Nagrania Muza (1986)
- 1992 The Hungarian Bop-Art Orchestra - Cliniical Picture Cél (1992)
- 1993 Krzysztof Ścierański - Far Away from Home Sound-Pol (1993)
