= Michał Urbaniak =

Polish jazz musician (1943–2025)

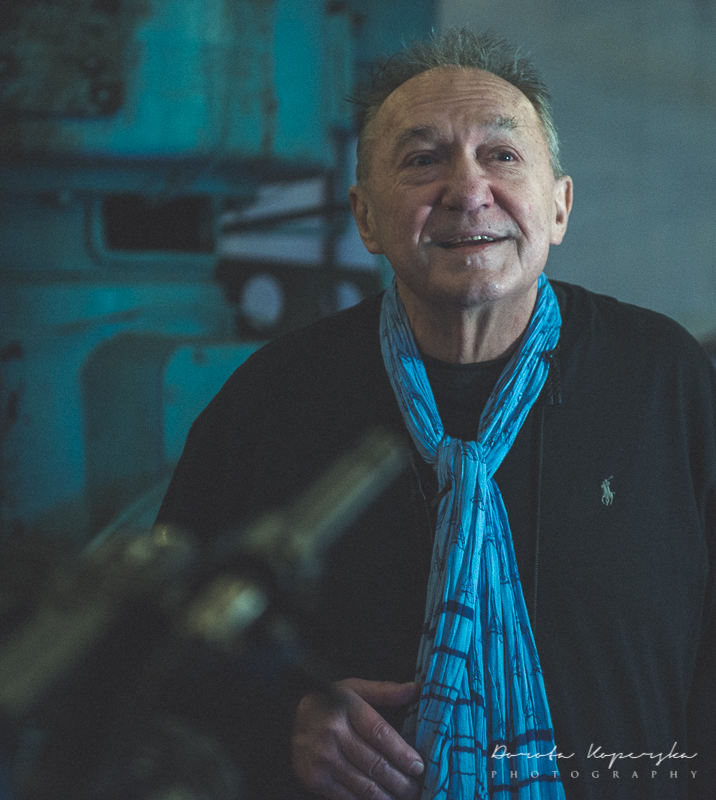
- Urbaniak in 2019

Background information
- Born: 22 January 1943; Warsaw, General Government (now Poland)
- Died: 20 December 2025 (aged 82)
- Genres: Jazz, jazz fusion, funk, hip hop
- Occupation: Musician
- Instruments: Violin, lyricon, saxophone
- Label: Ubx
- Website: www.urbaniak.com

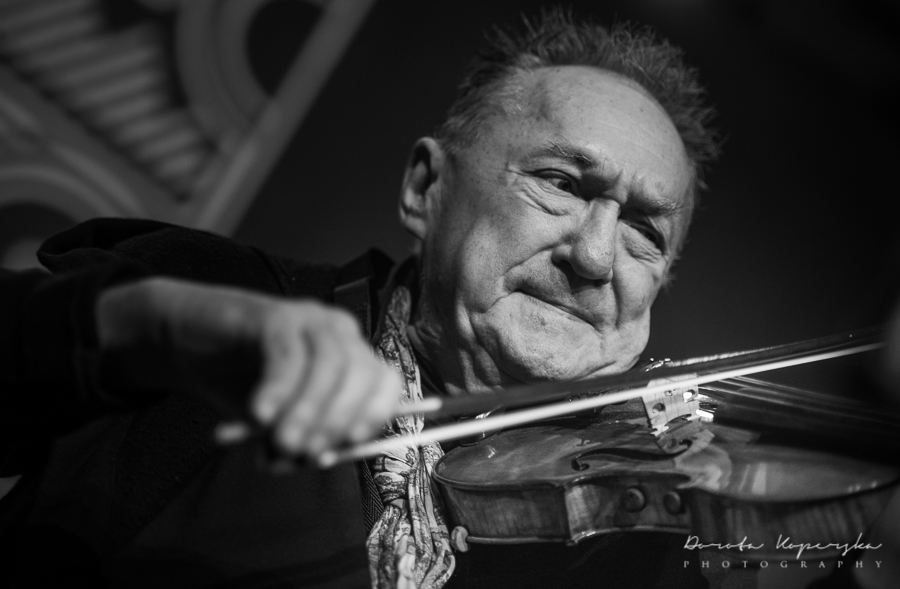
Michał Urbaniak, concert on 2019 at the Guido Mine, Zabrze as part of the LOTOS Jazz Festival at 21. Bielska Zadymka Jazzowa

Michał Urbaniak (22 January 1943 – 20 December 2025) was a Polish jazz musician who played violin, lyricon, and saxophone. His music includes elements of folk music, rhythm and blues, hip hop, and symphonic music.

== Life and career ==
Urbaniak was born in Warsaw, General Government on 22 January 1943. He started his music education during high school in Łódź, Poland, and continued from 1961 in Warsaw in the violin class of Tadeusz Wroński. Learning to play on the alto saxophone alone, he first played in a Dixieland band, and later with Zbigniew Namysłowski and the Jazz Rockers, with whom he performed during the Jazz Jamboree festival in 1961. After this, he was invited to play with Andrzej Trzaskowski, and toured the United States in 1962 with the Andrzej Trzaskowski band, the Wreckers, playing at festivals and clubs in Newport, San Francisco, Chicago, Washington, D.C., and New York City.

After returning to Poland, he worked with Krzysztof Komeda's quintet (1962–1964). Together, they left for Scandinavia, where, after finishing a couple of contracts, Urbaniak remained until 1969. There he created a band with Urszula Dudziak and Wojciech Karolak, which gained considerable success and was later to be the starting point for Michał Urbaniak Fusion.

After Urbaniak returned to Poland again and the violin (which he abandoned for the saxophone during the time in Scandinavia), he created the Michał Urbaniak Group, to which he invited, among others, Urszula Dudziak (vocals), Adam Makowicz (piano), Pawel Jarzebski – bass, and Czeslaw Bartkowski – drums. They recorded their first international albums, Parathyphus B, Instinct and played in many festivals, including Jazz Jamboree in 1969–1972. During the Montreux 1971 festival, Urbaniak was awarded "Grand Prix" for the best soloist and received a scholarship to the Berklee College of Music in Boston. After many triumphant concerts in Europe and the United States, in May 1973 he played for the last time before a Polish audience and emigrated with Urszula Dudziak on 11 September 1973, to the United States, where he lived as a U.S. citizen.

Despite getting an award from Berklee, he did not study there. Recommended by John H. Hammond, Urbaniak signed a contract with Columbia Records, who published the West German album Super Constellation under the name Fusion. For the tour, he invited Polish musicians, including Czesław Bartkowski, Paweł Jarzębski, and Wojciech Karolak. In 1974, Urbaniak formed the band Fusion and introduced melodic and rhythmic elements of Polish folk music into his funky New York-based music. With this band Urbaniak recorded another album for Columbia in New York: Atma.

Urbaniak followed his musical journey with innovative projects such as Urbanator (the first band to fuse rap and hip-hop in jazz), Urbanizer (a project with his band and four-piece R&B vocal group, 1978) and UrbSymphony. On 27 January 1995, UrbSymphony performed and recorded a concert with a rapper and a 60-piece symphony orchestra.

From 1970 on, Urbaniak played his custom-made, five-string violin furnished especially for him, a violin synthesizer nicknamed "talking" violin; soprano, alto and tenor saxophones; and lyricon, an electric saxophone-like horn. His fusion with a hint of folklore was becoming popular among American jazz musicians. He started to play in well known clubs such as the Village Vanguard and Village Gate and in famous concert halls such as Carnegie Hall, Beacon Theatre, and Avery Fisher Hall.

Urbaniak played with Billy Cobham, Buster Williams, Chick Corea, Harold Ivory Williams, Elvin Jones, Freddie Hubbard, George Benson, Herbie Hancock, Joe Henderson, Joe Zawinul, Kenny Barron, Larry Coryell, Lenny White, Marcus Miller, Quincy Jones, Ron Carter, Roy Haynes, Vladyslav Sendecki, Wayne Shorter, and Weather Report. In 1985, he was invited to play during the recording of Tutu with Miles Davis.

In 2012, he acted in the Polish film My Father's Bike.

Urbaniak died on 20 December 2025, at the age of 82.

== Discography ==
=== As leader ===
- Urbaniak's Orchestra (1968)
- Live Recording (1971)
- New Violin Summit with Don Harris, Jean-Luc Ponty (1972)
- Super Constellation (and Constellation in Concert) (1973)
- Paratyphus B (1973)
- Inactin (1973)
- Michal Urbaniak - Tomasz Stanko - Attila Zoller - Urszula Dudziak: We'll Remember Komeda (1973)
- Moving South (1973)
- Polish Jazz (1973)
- Atma (1974)
- Fusion (1974)
- Super Constellation (1974)
- Funk Factory (1975)
- Fusion III (EMI, 1975)
- Body English (1976)
- The Beginning (Catalyst, 1976)
- Tribute to Komeda (BASF, 1976)
- Urbaniak (Inner City, 1977)
- Smiles Ahead (1977)
- Ecstasy (Marlin, 1978)
- Heritage (MPS, 1978)
- Urban Express (EastWest, 1979)
- Daybreak (Pausa, 1980)
- Music for Violin and Jazz Quartet (1980)
- Serenade for the City (1980)
- Folk Songs: Children's Melodies (Antilles, 1981)
- Jam at Sandy's (Jam, 1981)
- Daybreak (1981)
- My One and Only Love (SteepleChase, 1982)
- The Larry Coryell and Michael Urbaniak Duo (Keynote, 1982)
- Recital with Władysław Sendecki (1983)
- A Quiet Day in Spring (Steeplechase, 1983)
- Facts of Life, Urbaniak/Coryell Band (SWS, 1983)
- Take Good Care of My Heart (SteepleChase, 1984)
- Burning Circuits (Sonet, 1984)
- Michael Urbaniak (Headfirst, 1986)
- Milky Way (Bellaphon, 1987)
- Live At The Warsaw Philharmonic (1987)
- Urbaniax (1998)
- Recital (1998)
- Cinemode (1988)
- Songs for Poland (Ubx, 1988)
- Folk Songs, Children's Melodies, Jazz Tunes, And Others... (1988)
- New York Five at the Village Vanguard (1989)
- Urban Express (1989)
- Milky Way, Some Other Blues, Mardin (1990)
- Cinemode (Rykodisc, 1990)
- Songbird (SteepleChase, 1990)
- Code Blue (1990)
- Michal Urbaniak (Headfirst, 1991)
- Manhattan Man (Milan, 1992)
- Milky Way (L & R, 1992)
- Burning Circuits, Urban Express, Manhattan Man (1992)
- Just Friends - Nevertheless (1992)
- Michal Urbaniak Quartet At The Village Vanguard (1993)
- Urbanator (1993)
- Friday Night at the Village Vanguard (Storyville, 1994)
- Some Other Blues (SteepleChase, 1994)
- Code Blue (1996)
- Urbanator II (1996)
- Live in Holy City (UBX Records, 1997)
- Ask Me Now (SteepleChase, 2000)
- Just a Funky Feeling, Urbanizer (UBX Records, 2001)
- Michał Urbaniak, Urszula Dudziak, Mika Urbaniak – Życie Pisane Na Orkiestrę (2001)
- From Poland with Jazz (2002)
- mSax&Love (2002)
- Urbsymphony (UBX Recordsx, 2003)
- Eden (Sony, 2003)
- Decadence (UBX Records, 2004)
- Urbanizer (UBX Records, 2004)
- Urbanator III (2005)
- Michal Urbaniak's Group (2005)
- Urbaniak / Lackerschmid Connection – Polish Wind (Minor Music, 2005)
- I Jazz Love You (UBX Records, 2006)
- Sax Love (UBX Records, 2006)
- Polish Wind (Minor Music, 2007)
- Miles of Blue (2009)
- Sax Love (2009)
- SBB & Michal Urbaniak (2015)
- UrbSymphony (2015)
- Michal Urbaniak Presents Urbanator Days Beats & Pieces (2015)
- For Warsaw with Love (2019)

=== As sideman ===
With Urszula Dudziak

- 1976 Urszula
- 1977 Midnight Rain
- 1979 Future Talk
- 1983 Sorrow Is Not Forever...But Love Is
- 2010 Jazz Na Hradé

With others

- 1965 Solarius, Rolf Kühn
- 1970, Enigmatic, Czesław Niemen
- 1971 Swiss Suite, Oliver Nelson
- 1973 Bosko Petrovic's Nonconvertible All Stars – Swinging East
- 1974 Journey, Arif Mardin (Atlantic)
- 1975 Mourner's Rhapsody, Czesław Niemen
- 1977 Tomorrow's Promises, Don Pullen
- 1977 The Lion and the Ram, Larry Coryell
- 1979 The Motive Behind The Smile, Cam Newton
- 1980 Swish, Michael Brecker
- 1981 Stratus, Billy Cobham
- 1984 Islands, Scott Cossu
- 1986, Rhythm & BLU, John Blake / Didier Lockwood / Michael Urbaniak
- 1986 Tutu, Miles Davis
- 1987 Music from Siesta, Miles Davis/Marcus Miller
- 1987 The Camera Never Lies, Michael Franks
- 1989 Whispers and Promises, Earl Klugh
- 1994 Rejoicing, Paul Bley
- 1994 Mo' Jamaica Funk, Tom Browne
- 1995 Present Tense, Lenny White
- 1996 Swish, Harris Simon Group
- 2002 Glass Menagerie, Billy Cobham
- 2003 Nevertheless, Bob Malach
- 2004 Music for Planets, People, and Washing Machines, Randy Bernsen
- 2016 Kino Mocne, Dariusz Makaruk
