= Jan Ptaszyn Wróblewski =

Polish jazz musician, composer and arranger (1936–2024)

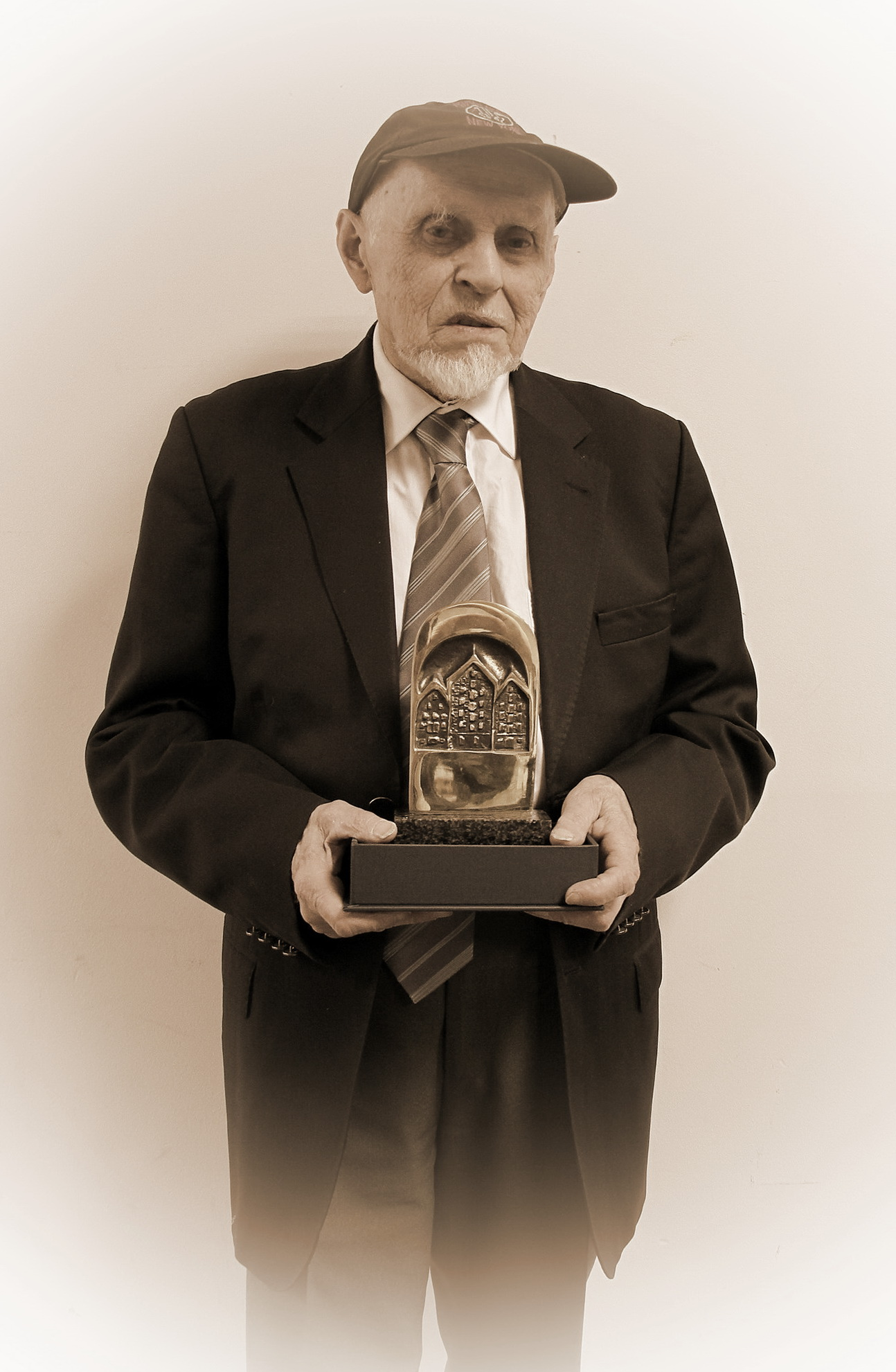
Wróblewski in 2017

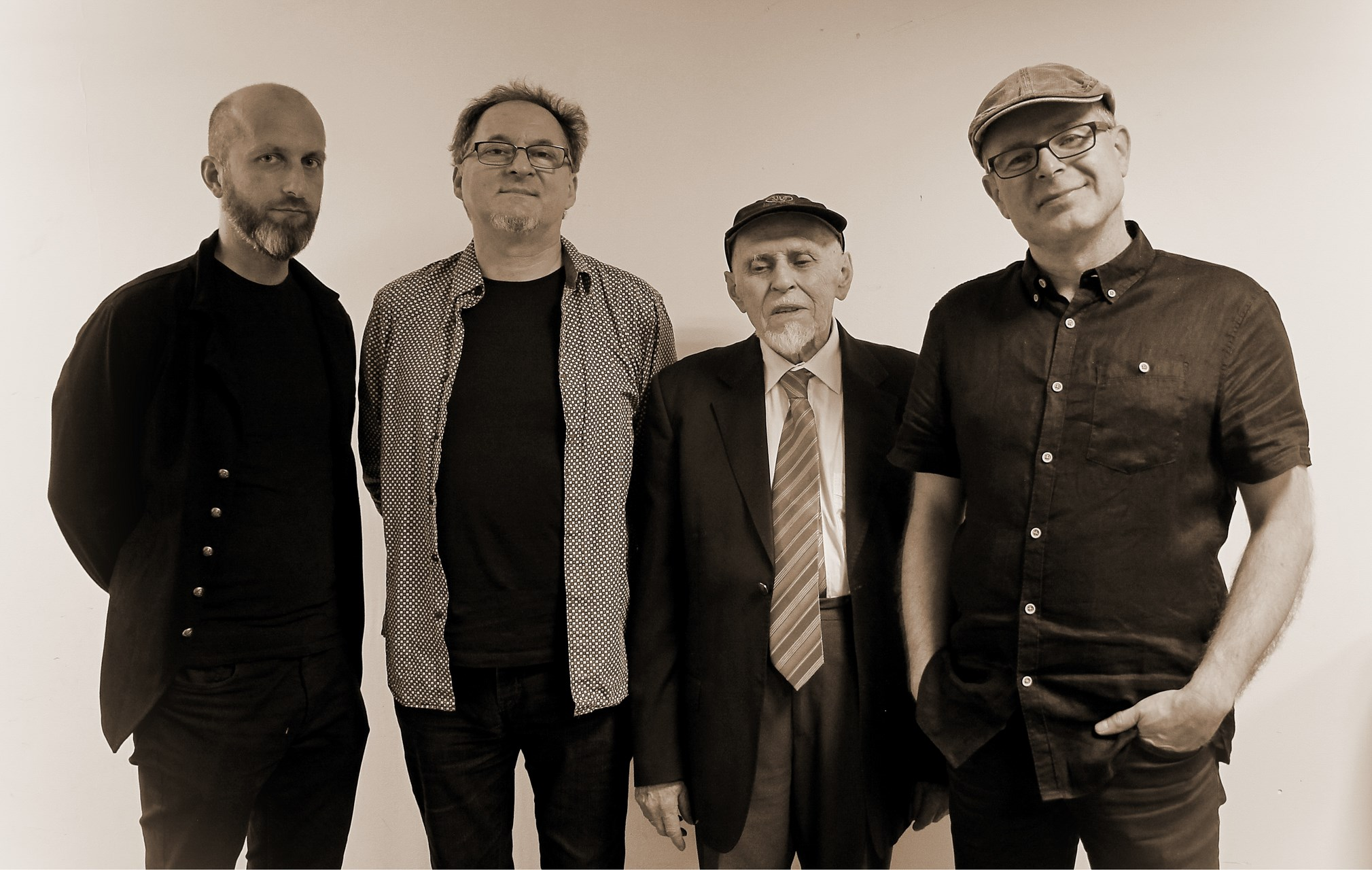
Jan Ptaszyn Wróblewski Quartet (2017)

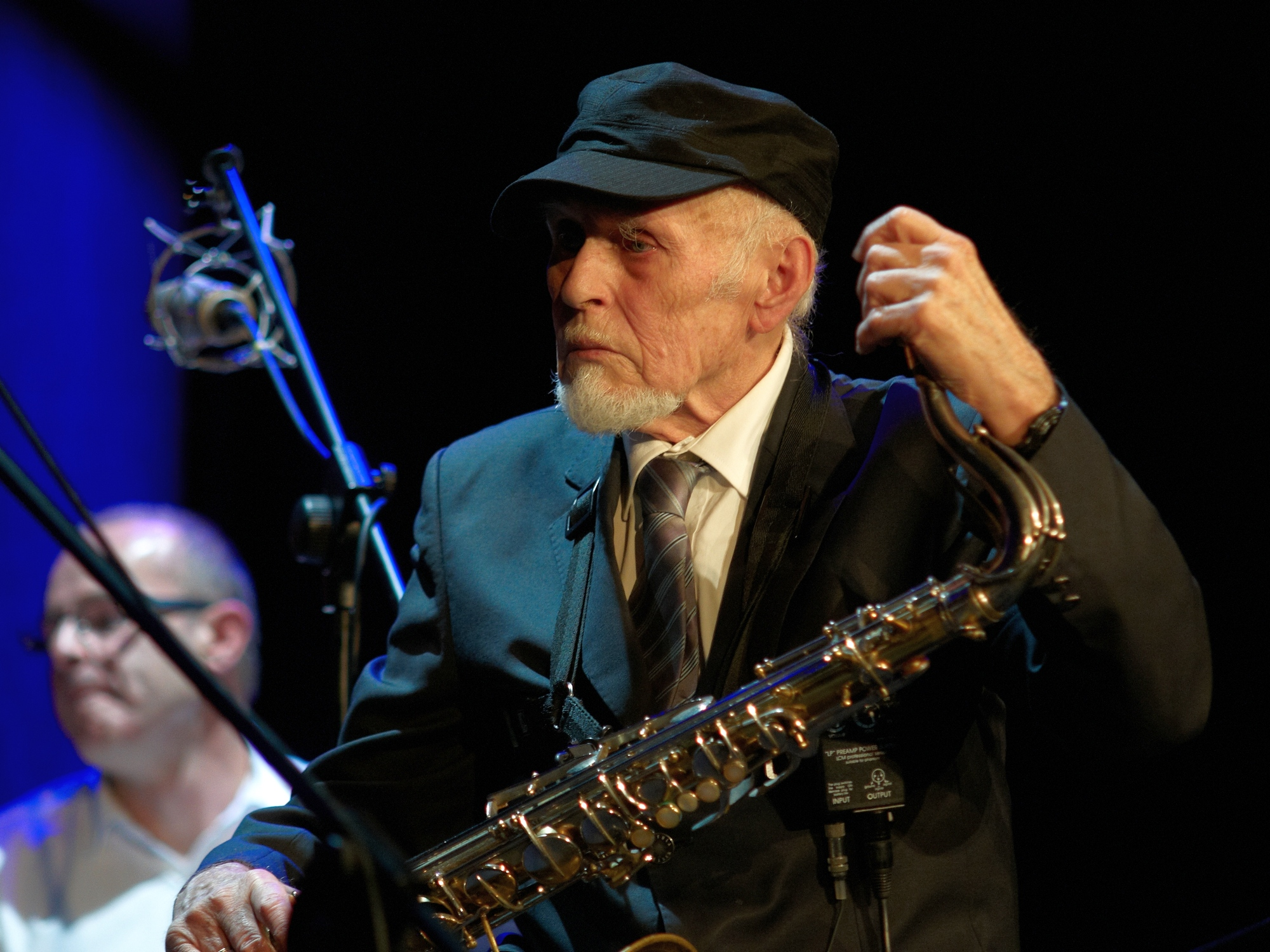
Wróblewski in 2013

Jan "Ptaszyn" Wróblewski (27 March 1936 – 7 May 2024) was a Polish jazz musician, composer and arranger. He played the tenor and baritone saxophones.

Wróblewski began his musical career in 1956 at the first Sopot Jazz Festival in Krzysztof Komeda's group. In 1958, he became the first Polish jazz musician to perform at the Newport Jazz Festival as a member of the International Youth Band. He toured around the world and for a decade, beginning in 1958, he directed the Polish Radio Jazz Studio. He was associated with Third Stream.

Wróblewski also hosted the DJ of Europe's longest running jazz program, broadcast weekly by the Polskie Radio Program III from 1970.

Wróblewski died on 7 May 2024, at the age of 88.

== Discography ==
- 1956 Sextet Komedy: Festiwal Jazzowy Sopot
- 1958 All Stars Swingtet
- 1958 Jazz Believers
- 1958 Newport International Youth Band
- 1960 Quintet Ptaszyna Wróblewskiego
- 1960 Jazz Jamboree ’60
- 1961 Jazz Outsiders
- 1961 Kwintet Jerzego Miliana + Jan Ptaszyn Wróblewski
- 1961 Jazz Jamboree ’61
- 1962 Ballet Etudes: The Music of Komeda
- 1963 Kwintet Andrzeja Kurylewicza
- 1964 Polish Jazz Quartet
- 1965 Ptaszyn Wróblewski Quartet
- 1965 Jazz Jamboree ’65
- 1969 Studio Jazzowe Polskiego Radia
- 1974 Sprzedawcy glonów
- 1975 SPPT Chałturnik i Andrzej Rosiewicz
- 1976 Skleroptak
- 1977 Mainstream
- 1977 Kisa Magnusson & Mainstream
- 1978 Jam Session w Akwarium 1
- 1978 Flyin' Lady
- 1980 Z lotu Ptaka
- 1983 New Presentation
- 1989 Jan Ptaszyn Wróblewski: Polish Jazz
- 1993 Czwartet-Live In Hades
- 1995 Made in Poland
- 1998 Henryk Wars Songs
- 2005 Real Jazz
- 2007 Supercalifragilistic
- 2014 Moi pierwsi mistrzowie – Komeda/Trzaskowski/Kurylewicz (Boogie Production)
