= A False Glimmer =

- Homeland episode
- Episode no.: Season 5 Episode 12
- Directed by: Lesli Linka Glatter
- Written by: Alex Gansa; Ron Nyswaner; Liz Flahive
- Production code: 5WAH12
- Original air date: December 20, 2015
- Running time: 57 minutes

Guest appearances
- Atheer Adel as Numan; Mark Ivanir as Ivan Krupin; René Ifrah as Bibi; Nina Hoss as Astrid; Rus Blackwell as surgical doctor; Micah Hauptman as Mills; Stefanie Mueller as Erna Richter; Jörg Hartmann as doctor

Episode chronology
← Previous "Our Man in Damascus"	Next → "Fair Game"
- Homeland season 5

"A False Glimmer" is the twelfth episode and the season finale of the fifth season of the American television drama series Homeland, and the 60th episode overall. It was broadcast on Showtime on December 20, 2015.

== Plot ==
Carrie (Claire Danes) tracks down Qasim (Alireza Bayram) in the subway tracks. She convinces an already hesitant Qasim to intervene in Bibi's (René Ifrah) releasing of the sarin gas. Carrie offers her gun but Qasim is only willing to try and talk Bibi out of it. Qasim is shot by Bibi when he refuses to back down, and tackles Bibi in response. Carrie approaches and shoots Bibi in the back as they struggle, killing him and neutralizing the threat. Qasim succumbs to his wounds.

With Allison on the run, Saul (Mandy Patinkin) presses Krupin (Mark Ivanir) for details on what her extraction procedure would be. Saul notes that with Allison having abandoned the CIA, Krupin no longer has a viable claim to being her informant. Saul makes an offer to Krupin: a new identity and witness protection in exchange for the information he wants. Krupin accepts.

Numan (Atheer Adel) is apprehended by the BND. By threatening to have Numan deported to Turkey (where he is now an enemy of the state), Astrid (Nina Hoss) coerces Laura (Sarah Sokolovic) into making a false public declaration that Faisal Marwan had been working with the terrorist cell in Berlin.

Carrie attempts to reopen her relationship with Jonas (Alexander Fehling). Jonas declines, saying he cannot live with the safety of his family in doubt, recalling what happened to his son. Saul makes overtures to Carrie to rejoin the CIA, offering her the power to choose her own missions and team members. Carrie repeatedly rebuffs him, saying "I'm not that person any more". Otto Düring essentially proposes to Carrie, which would allow her to co-head the Foundation and help him use his money for good.

Allison's (Miranda Otto) handlers try to smuggle her out of the country in the trunk of their car. The car is diverted to a detour in Poland where it runs over a spike strip. A group of gunmen unload hundreds of bullets into the disabled car, killing all inside. Saul emerges from the shadows and checks the trunk of the car, finding Allison's dead body riddled with bullets.

Quinn (Rupert Friend) suffers a massive brain hemorrhage, making his chance of recovering any brain function minimal. Dar Adal (F. Murray Abraham) presents Carrie with the letter Quinn wrote for her before he embarked for Syria. After several days with no signs of recovery, Carrie enters Quinn's hospital room alone and barricades the door closed. She removes Quinn's pulse monitor and places it on her own finger. The episode ends with Carrie seeing a burst of sunlight come through the window.

== Production ==
The episode was directed by executive producer Lesli Linka Glatter and co-written by showrunner Alex Gansa, co-executive producer Ron Nyswaner, and Liz Flahive in her first writing credit for the series.

Climactic scenes of the episode, in which a major terrorist attack on Berlin is attempted, were filmed the day after the November 2015 Paris attacks occurred. Gansa and Glatter both commented on the disquiet that the real-life events caused on set.

Rupert Friend wrote the text of the letter that Quinn had left for Carrie.

== Reception ==
=== Reviews ===
The episode received a rating of 71% with an average score of 7.7 out of 10 on the review aggregator Rotten Tomatoes, with the site's consensus stating "By tying up the terror plot early in 'A False Glimmer,' Homeland's fifth season comes to an uncharacteristically quiet ending".

IGN's Scott Collura rated the episode 9.0 out of 10, saying in summary that it "really managed to bring just about every element of the season to a thoughtful and emotionally satisfying close". Shirley Li of Entertainment Weekly positively reviewed the episode, and said of the final scene "I liked this ending for the way it concentrated back on Carrie and on the effect Quinn has on her". Cynthia Littleton of Variety remarked that it "maintains the breathtaking pace of a thriller" despite its focus on character moments, and added that "it’s the work turned in by Claire Danes, who never ceases to impress with her dexterity, that makes the whole thing tick". Judith Warner of The New York Times had a more negative take, concluding that "the whole thing just had the feel of a desperate race to the close".

=== Ratings ===
The original broadcast was watched by 2.07 million viewers, making it the most-watched episode of the season.
