= Art Directors Guild Awards 2015 =

Annual US film and television awards ceremony

20th Art Directors Guild Awards
- Date: January 31, 2016

The 20th Art Directors Guild Awards, were given on January 31, 2016, honoring the best production designers of 2015.

== Winners and nominees ==
=== Film ===
Period Film:

- Jack Fisk – The Revenant
  - Adam Stockhausen – Bridge of Spies
  - Thomas E. Sanders – Crimson Peak
  - Eve Stewart – The Danish Girl
  - Mark Ricker – Trumbo

Fantasy Film:

- Colin Gibson – Mad Max: Fury Road
  - Dante Ferretti – Cinderella
  - Edward Verreaux – Jurassic World
  - Rick Carter & Darren Gilford – Star Wars: The Force Awakens
  - Scott Chambliss – Tomorrowland

Contemporary Film:

- Arthur Max – The Martian
  - Mark Digby – Ex Machina
  - Judy Becker – Joy
  - Patrice Vermette – Sicario
  - Dennis Gassner – Spectre

=== Television ===
One-Hour Period or Fantasy Single-Camera Television Series

- Deborah Riley – Game of Thrones (for "Hardhome", "High Sparrow", "Unbowed, Unbent, Unbroken")
  - Richard Berg – Gotham (for "Damned If You Do...", "Strike Force")
  - Dan Bishop – Mad Men (for "Person to Person")
  - Howard Cummings – The Knick (for "The Best with the Best to Get the Best", "Ten Knots")
  - Donal Woods – Downton Abbey (for "A Moorland Holiday")

One-Hour Contemporary Single-Camera Television Series

- Steve Arnold – House of Cards (for "Chapter 29", "Chapter 36")
  - Tony Fanning – Better Call Saul (for "Five-O", "Marco", "RICO")
  - John D. Kretschmer – Homeland (for "All About Allison", "The Litvinov Ruse", "The Tradition of Hospitality")
  - Steve Saklad – Empire (for "Pilot")
  - Karen Steward – True Detective (for "Night Finds You", "Omega Station", "The Western Book of the Dead")

Episode of a Half Hour Single-Camera Television Series

- Denise Pizzini – The Muppets (for "The Ex-Factor", "Pig’s in a Blackout")
  - Claire Bennett – Transparent (for "The Book of Life", "Kina Hora", "Oscillate")
  - James Gloster – Veep (for "Election Night", "Joint Session")
  - Bruce Robert Hill – The Last Man on Earth (for "Alive in Tucson", "Is There Anybody Out There?", "Silent Night")
  - Richard Toyon – Silicon Valley (for "Adult Content", "Homicide", "Sand Hill Shuffle")

Multi-Camera Series

- John Shaffner – The Big Bang Theory (for "The Mystery Date Observation", "The Platonic Permutation", "The Skywalker Incursion")
  - Greg Grande – Clipped (for "Dreamers", "Wi-Fi", "World's Rudest Barbershop")
  - Stephan Olson – Truth Be Told (for "Big Black Coffee", "Member's Only", "Pilot")
  - Glenda Rovello – 2 Broke Girls (for "And the Coming Out Party", "And the Escape Room", "And the Maybe Baby")
  - John Shaffner – Mom (for "Fun Girl Stuff and Eternal Salvation", "Mashed Potatoes and a Little Nitrous", "Six Popes and Red Ferrari")

Miniseries or Television Movie:

- Mark Worthington – American Horror Story: Hotel (for "Checking In")
  - Pat Campbell – Wolf Hall (for "Three Card Trick")
  - Michael Hanan – Tut (for "Betrayal", "Destiny", "Power")
  - Clark Hunter – Bessie
  - Warren Alan Young – Fargo (for "Before the Law", "Fear and Trembling", "Waiting for Dutch")
