= Homeland season 5 =

Season of television series

Homeland
- Season 5
- Blu-ray cover art
- Starring: Claire Danes; Rupert Friend; Sebastian Koch; Miranda Otto; Alexander Fehling; Sarah Sokolovic; F. Murray Abraham; Mandy Patinkin
- No. of episodes: 12

Release
- Original network: Showtime
- Original release: October 4 – December 20, 2015

Season chronology
- ← Previous; Season 4 Next → Season 6

The fifth season of the American television drama series Homeland premiered on October 4, 2015, and concluded on December 20, 2015, on Showtime, consisting of 12 episodes. The series started as a loosely based variation of the two-season run of the Israeli television series Hatufim (English: Prisoners of War) created by Gideon Raff and is developed for American television by Howard Gordon and Alex Gansa. The fifth season was released on Blu-ray and DVD on January 10, 2017.

Set two years after the previous season, season 5 finds Carrie no longer working for the CIA, but for a philanthropic foundation in Berlin, the Düring Foundation, cooperating with her former colleagues to stop a terror attack on Berlin as well as locate a CIA mole. The season references several real-world subjects in its storylines, including ISIS, Vladimir Putin, Bashar al-Assad, the Charlie Hebdo shooting, Edward Snowden and the European migrant crisis.

== Cast and characters ==
=== Main ===
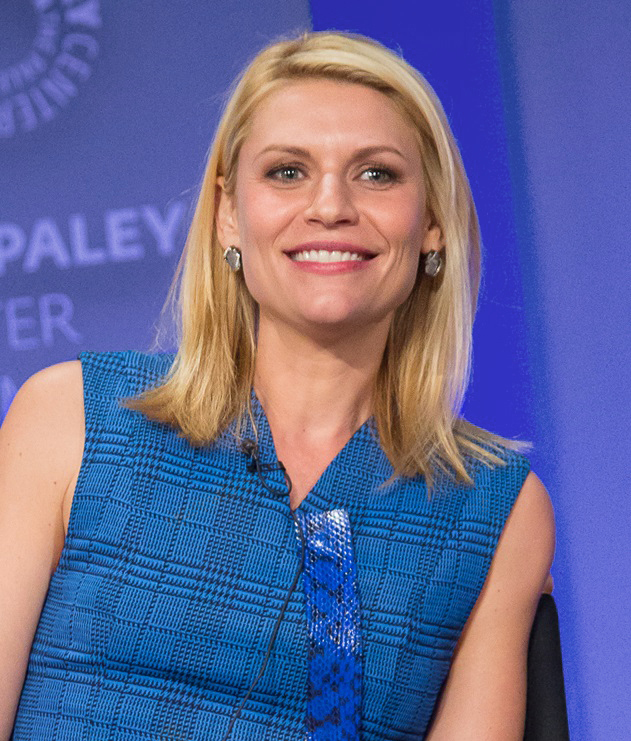
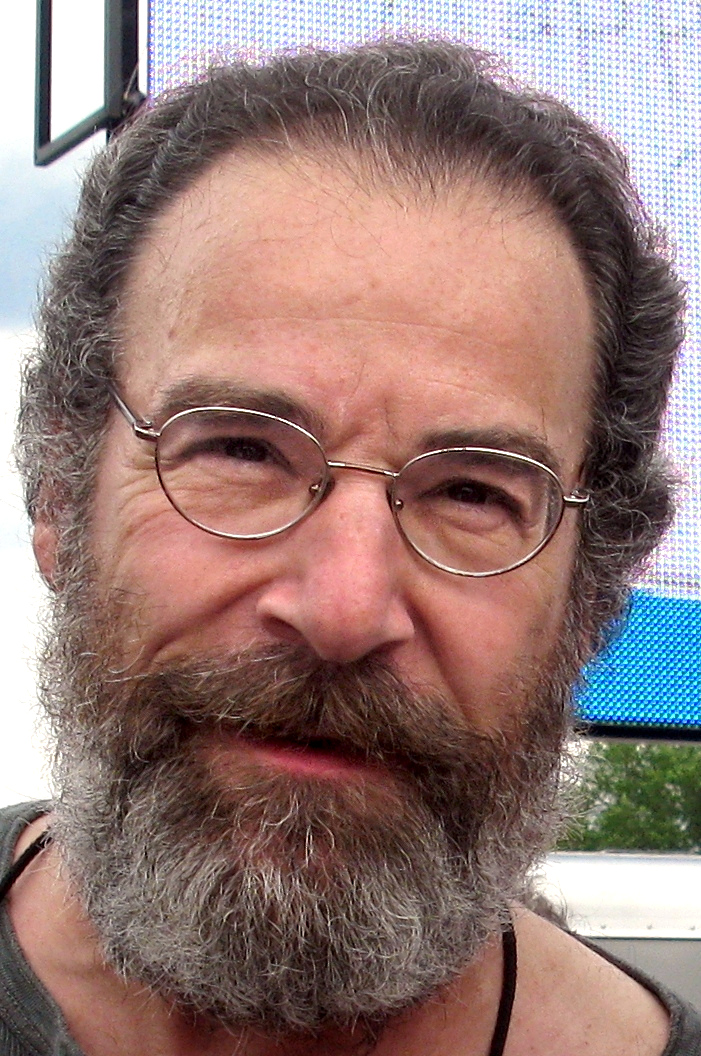
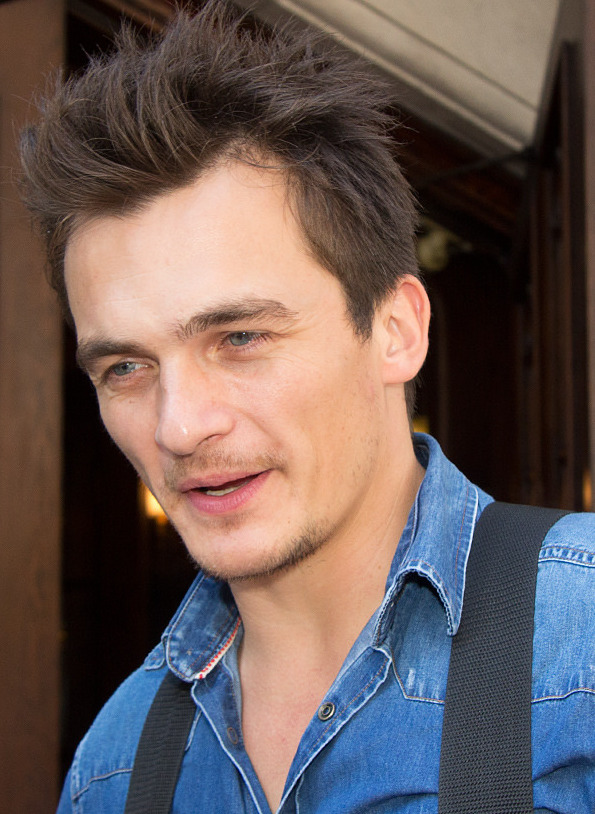
Claire Danes, Mandy Patinkin and Rupert Friend (left to right) portray lead roles Carrie Mathison, Saul Berenson and Peter Quinn, respectively.
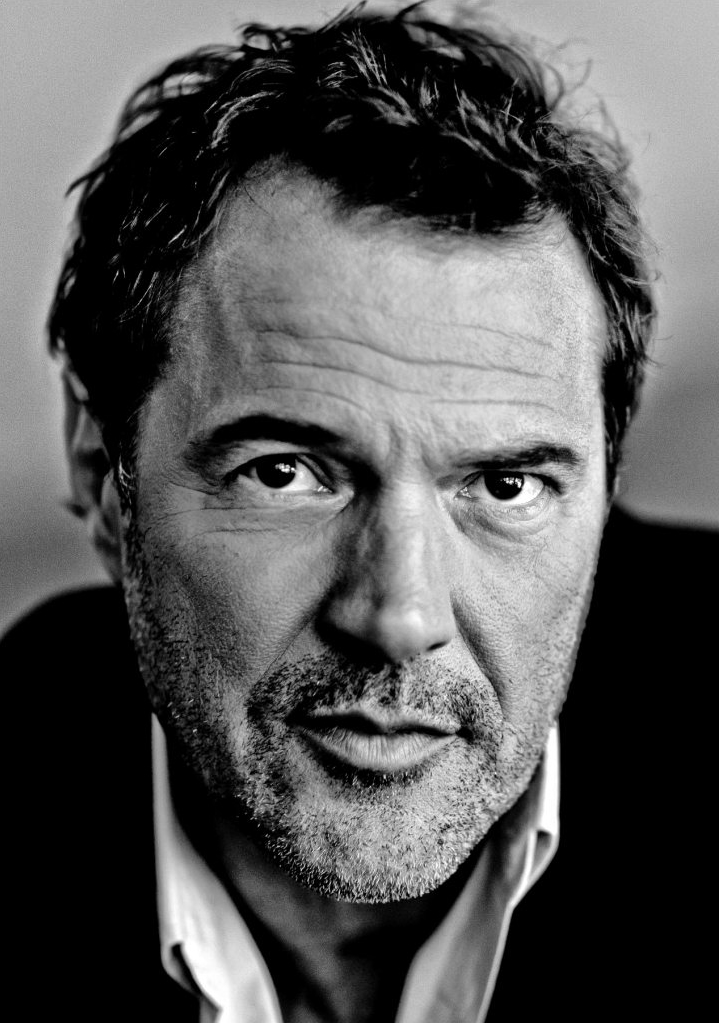
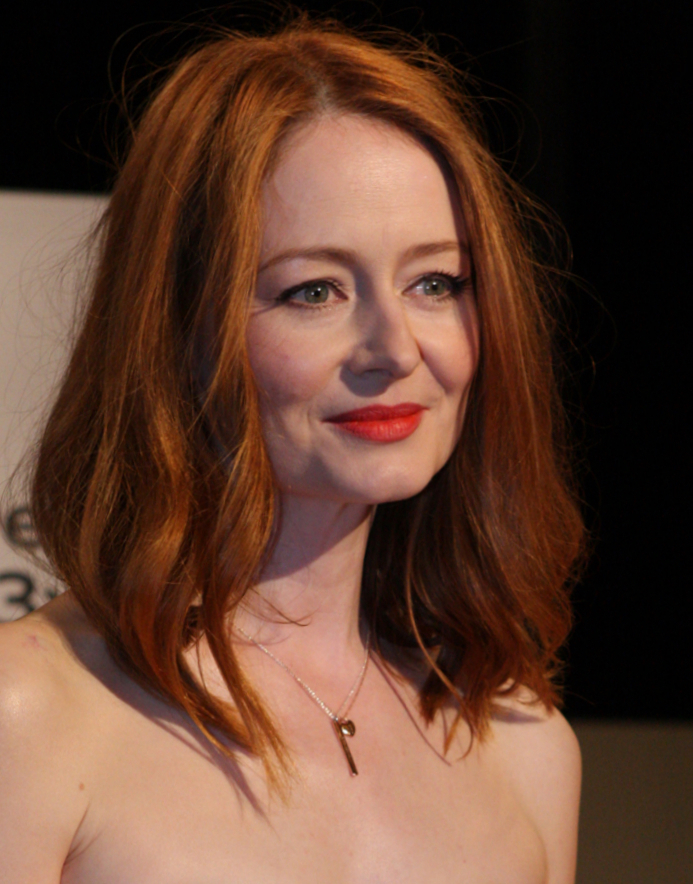
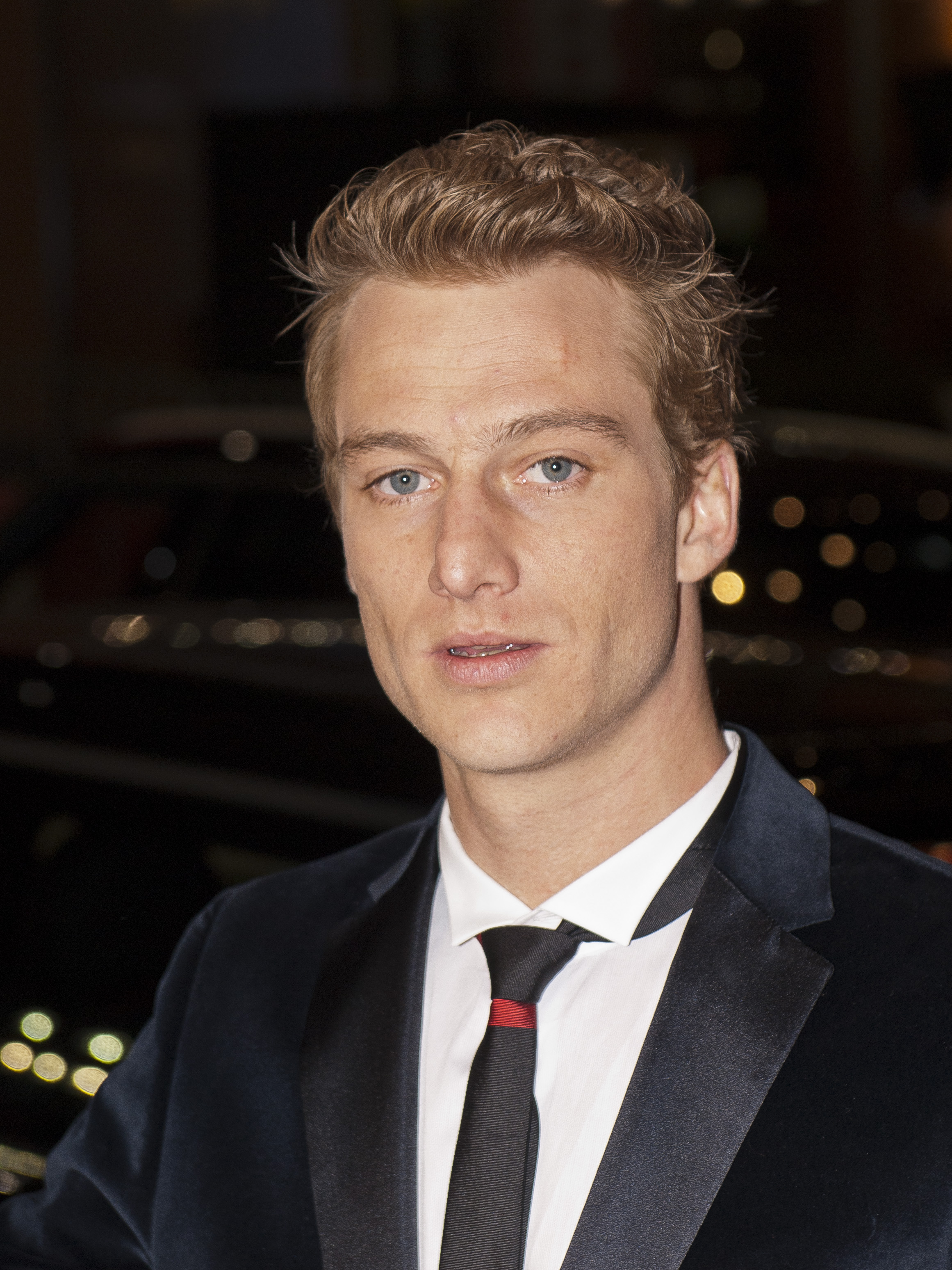
Sebastian Koch, Miranda Otto and Alexander Fehling (left to right) portray Otto Düring, Allison Carr and Jonas Hollander, respectively.
- Claire Danes as Carrie Mathison, an ex-CIA intelligence officer with bipolar disorder, now working for a philanthropic foundation in Berlin
- Rupert Friend as Peter Quinn, a CIA SAD/SOG (black ops) operative
- Sebastian Koch as Otto Düring, a German philanthropist and Carrie's boss
- Miranda Otto as Allison Carr, the current Berlin CIA Chief of Station, working directly under Saul
- Alexander Fehling as Jonas Hollander, legal counsel for the Düring Foundation and Carrie's boyfriend
- Sarah Sokolovic as Laura Sutton, an American journalist in Berlin who works for the Düring Foundation
- F. Murray Abraham as Dar Adal, a retired black ops specialist, currently head of the CIA
- Mandy Patinkin as Saul Berenson, the head of the CIA's European operations and Carrie's mentor

=== Recurring ===
- Nina Hoss as Astrid, Quinn's former lover who works for the German intelligence service, BND
- Martin Wuttke as Adler, the head of the BND
- Atheer Adel as Numan (alias "gabehcuod"), a computer hacker who downloads classified CIA files
- Sven Schelker as Armand Korzenik, Numan's friend and fellow hacker
- Sebastian Hülk as Hans Podolski, a BND officer
- Micah Hauptman as Mills, a CIA tech working in the Berlin Station
- Allan Corduner as Etai Luskin, Israeli ambassador to Germany
- Mark Ivanir as Ivan Krupin, a Russian intelligence agent
- René Ifrah as Bibi Hamed, leader of a group of jihadists in Berlin
- Alireza Bayram as Qasim, member of a jihadist group in Berlin
- Darwin Shaw as Ahmed Nazari, Allison's former asset from Baghdad
- Morocco Omari as Conrad Fuller, a CIA agent working at the Berlin Station

=== Guest ===
- John Getz as Joe Crocker, a senior CIA officer working in Langley
- Luna and Lotta Pfitzer as Frances "Franny" Mathison, Carrie's daughter
- George Georgiou as Al Amin, a Hezbollah commander
- Alex Lanipekun as Hank Wonham, a CIA officer who worked with Carrie in Islamabad
- Max Beesley as Mike Brown, a member of Carrie's security detail in Beirut
- Mousa Kraish as Behruz, an associate of Al Amin
- Suraj Sharma as Aayan Ibrahim, who appears to Carrie in a hallucination
- William R. Moses as Scott, the U.S. Ambassador to Germany
- Steve Nicolson as Boris, Russian ambassador to Germany
- Yigal Naor as General Youssef, a Syrian military leader Saul attempts to install as the country's president in a coup against Bashar al-Assad
- Janina Blohm Sievers as Sabine, a computer hacker
- Reymond Amsalem as Mrs. Luskin
- Darina Al Joundi as Mrs. Youssef
- Emily Cox as Claudia, friend of Sabine
- Jarreth Merz as Hajik Zayd, leader of a jihadist group
- Ori Yaniv as Esam, Carrie's former informant
- Makram Khoury as Samir Khalil, an Iraqi national who helps Carrie
- Oshri Cohen as Igal
- Assaad Bouab as Waleed
- Rainer Bock as BND Officer Keller
- Hadar Ratzon Rotem as Tova Rivlin, a Mossad agent
- Rachid Sabitri as Dr. Aman Aziz, a professor who helps Bibi
- Rus Blackwell as Dr. Emory, a surgical doctor
- Stefanie Mueller as Erna Richter, working for the German Foreign Office

== Episodes ==
No. overall	No. in season	Title	Directed by	Written by	Original release date	Prod. code	U.S. viewers (millions)
49	1	"Separation Anxiety"	Lesli Linka Glatter	Chip Johannessen & Ted Mann	October 4, 2015	5WAH01	1.66
Two years after the events of season 4, Carrie has left the CIA and works as a security consultant for the Düring Foundation in Berlin, where she lives with her daughter Franny and her boyfriend Jonas, the foundation's legal counsel. The foundation's head, Otto Düring, makes plans to travel to a Syrian refugee camp in Beirut to secure relief funds, against Carrie's warnings. Carrie secures safe passage to the camp for Otto after requesting help from a Hezbollah commander. Two hackers in Berlin obtain classified CIA documents revealing that the CIA and the German intelligence agency, the BND, are illegally spying on German citizens for counterterrorism purposes; they leak one of the documents to Laura Sutton, a journalist at the Düring Foundation. Saul, who has fallen out with Carrie after she derailed his bid for CIA Director, arrives in Berlin, where the BND orders him and Berlin station chief Allison Carr to end the surveillance program immediately. Saul independently continues the program, enlisting Quinn to assassinate confirmed targets.
50	2	"The Tradition of Hospitality"	Lesli Linka Glatter	Patrick Harbinson	October 11, 2015	5WAH02	1.40
After an attack in the refugee camp is foiled, Carrie and Otto are almost killed by an IED explosion while fleeing the scene. Carrie stays in Beirut to find out who was behind the attack and is told that she was the target, not Otto. Laura goes public with the leaked document revealing the CIA's illegal surveillance program. She is detained by the BND until Jonas obtains her release. After a meeting with the BND regarding the leak, Saul informs Allison that at the request of the German government she is being recalled from her position as station chief, but Allison reaches out to Dar Adal in an attempt to have Saul recalled instead. Quinn receives the name of his next assigned kill: Carrie Mathison.
51	3	"Super Powers"	Keith Gordon	Alex Gansa & Meredith Stiehm	October 18, 2015	5WAH03	1.11
Carrie sends her daughter to the U.S. for safety and takes refuge in a secluded cabin with Jonas while trying to find out who is after her. She decides to temporarily go off her medication, feeling her intellect is sharper without it. Saul confronts Allison over her attempt to get him recalled, and informs her he has negotiated with the BND to allow both of them to keep their postings in Berlin; the two are later shown to be in a sexual relationship. Numan, one of the hackers who leaked the classified documents, contacts Laura to give her the remainder, but is unaware that his partner Korzenik has stolen them and plans to sell them to Russian intelligence. Quinn kidnaps Jonas's son to draw Jonas away from Carrie; he arrives at the cabin that night and incapacitates Carrie.
52	4	"Why Is This Night Different?"	John Coles	Ron Nyswaner	October 25, 2015	5WAH04	1.63
Quinn holds Carrie in a warehouse and informs her of his orders to kill her; they take photos staging her death. She and Quinn scout the post office where Quinn receives his assignments to confirm whether it was Saul who gave the kill order; Quinn is ambushed by a hitman, who wounds him before being killed in a gunfight. Korzenik, expecting to sell the CIA documents to a Russian diplomat, is instead taken to meet with SVR agent Ivan Krupin, who tortures Korzenik to get the location of additional copies of the documents before killing him. Saul and Allison lure General Youssef of Syria to Switzerland and try to persuade him to take over for president Bashar al-Assad after a planned coup. Youssef boards a plane to return to Syria. Carrie calls the only contact number on the hitman's phone, and Allison answers in Russian; Youssef's plane explodes seconds later.
53	5	"Better Call Saul"	Michael Offer	Benjamin Cavell & Alex Gansa	November 1, 2015	5WAH05	1.30
Allison is revealed to be working for Ivan, who shows her Quinn's staged photo "confirming" Carrie's death. Allison suggests to her superiors that Israel is behind the bombing of General Youssef's plane; she manipulates Saul into suspecting Etai Luskin, his friend who is Israel's ambassador to Germany, while leading Dar Adal to suspect Saul and Etai conspired in the attack. Dar orders surveillance on Saul. Carrie learns from Astrid, who works for the BND, that the hitman who shot Quinn works for the SVR. She realizes that she needs to see the leaked documents, but Laura tells her the Russians have them, meaning the only way she can get them is from the CIA. Quinn's condition worsens; Jonas, who is with him, calls for an ambulance, but Quinn flees. Quinn attempts to kill himself, but is stopped by a passerby before falling unconscious.
54	6	"Parabiosis"	Alex Graves	Chip Johannessen & Ted Mann	November 8, 2015	5WAH06	1.35
Quinn is nursed to health by Hussein, the passerby, an Iraqi doctor who is not licensed to practice medicine in Germany but instead manages a building in which a group of Syrian jihadists reside. Quinn convinces most of the jihadists he is a mercenary, not a spy, but is forced to kill their leader in self-defense. Carrie tells Saul about her theory that the Russians want her dead, adding that she needs to see the leaked documents; Saul refuses to believe her, but becomes suspicious when he realizes he is being followed. He learns from Allison that Dar Adal ordered the surveillance. Jonas tells Carrie that Quinn escaped, and he leaves her when she refuses to go home with him. Carrie goes to Otto and requests a private plane to help her disappear. Saul covertly makes copies of the leaked documents and gives them to Otto before being detained by the CIA; Otto gives the documents to Carrie.
55	7	"Oriole"	Lesli Linka Glatter	Alex Gansa & Patrick Harbinson	November 15, 2015	5WAH07	1.35
Carrie reviews the documents and finds one indicating that one of her Iraqi informants tried to contact her and refused to speak to anyone but her. She calls the informant, who reports that he saw corrupt Iraqi lawyer Ahmed Nazari resurface after being presumed dead. Carrie tracks Nazari down to Amsterdam. Saul admits to Allison that he delivered his copy of the leaked documents to Carrie; Allison reports this to Ivan. While searching Nazari's house, Carrie sees one of Ivan's men remove something from his safe and narrowly escapes after being discovered. She calls Allison and requests a meet. Dar Adal orders that Saul be taken back to Langley, but Etai has his men extract Saul. Quinn learns that Bibi, now the jihadists' leader, is the nephew of a high-priority CIA kill target; seeing an opportunity, he agrees to guide the jihadists to the Syrian border after receiving Dar Adal's authorization.
56	8	"All About Allison"	Dan Attias	Ron Nyswaner	November 22, 2015	5WAH08	1.47
In flashbacks to 2005, Carrie arrives in Baghdad to replace Allison as a case officer. Allison introduces Carrie to Nazari, who is one of Allison's assets. Nazari turns out to be working for Ivan, who blackmails Allison into becoming a double agent for the SVR in exchange for millions of dollars Nazari has stolen from the Iraqi government and information that will help her rise through the ranks of the CIA. In the present, Etai helps Saul escape to a secure location after Mossad and the CIA reach a deal for Saul's return. In Kosovo, after restraining Quinn, the jihadists load ingredients for chemical weapons onto a truck and head back to Berlin. Carrie meets with Allison and asks her to review her reports on Nazari to determine whether he might have been a double agent. Numan hacks into Nazari's computer for Carrie, and Carrie sees a photo of Nazari taken at a beachside bar in St. Lucia that she recalls Allison mentioning in 2005; she realizes that Allison is working with the SVR.
57	9	"The Litvinov Ruse"	Tucker Gates	Story by : Howard Gordon & Patrick Harbinson; Teleplay by : Alex Gansa	November 29, 2015	5WAH09	1.42
Carrie and Saul enlist the BND to help them prove Allison is working for the SVR. Saul plants a bug in Allison's handbag while she is asleep. The BND tell Allison a top Russian agent plans to defect to Germany, triggering Allison to go to a Russian safehouse to meet with Ivan while under BND drone surveillance. Allison and Ivan are arrested, but Allison insists to Dar Adal that Ivan was her asset and not vice versa. Quinn is held captive by the jihadists, who are planning a sarin gas attack on Berlin. He attempts to convince Qasim, a young and inexperienced member of the group, to prevent the attack. Quinn is brought to a gas chamber where his death is to be filmed as a demonstration; Qasim covertly injects him with atropine, an antidote, shortly before he is placed inside. The gas is released, and Quinn begins convulsing.
58	10	"New Normal"	Dan Attias	Meredith Stiehm & Charlotte Stoudt	December 6, 2015	5WAH10	1.74
Ivan admits it was the SVR that engineered the bombing of General Youssef's plane. Dar Adal demands further evidence of Allison's guilt and elects to resolve the situation quietly in order to avoid a political scandal. Bibi releases a video demanding that the UN recognize the Islamic State within 24 hours or a chemical attack will be unleashed on a European city; footage of Quinn suffering the effects of the sarin gas is included to legitimize the threat. Carrie and Astrid scan the video for clues as to where it was filmed. Bibi executes a member of his group as punishment for saving Quinn's life, aware that Qasim – his cousin – was responsible, but unwilling to kill a family member. The BND arrest Faisal Marwan, a suspected jihadist, after the Düring Foundation learns he may have information about an attack on Berlin. While searching one of several possible locations of Bibi's hideout, Carrie and Astrid find Quinn alive and take him to a hospital, where he is placed in intensive care.
59	11	"Our Man in Damascus"	Seith Mann	David Fury	December 13, 2015	5WAH11	1.84
Carrie and Saul convince the doctors to revive Quinn to find out what he knows about the impending terrorist attack, but he goes into respiratory arrest and is placed back in a coma. Saul attempts to get information from Faisal; Laura goes on air and threatens to leak the remaining CIA documents unless Faisal is released, but Faisal commits suicide when left alone. Allison receives her final assignment from the SVR: to ensure the chemical attack succeeds. She tracks down the professor who designed the jihadists' sarin chamber and, after he tells her the time and location of the attack, kills both him and her CIA escort before shooting herself. She then tells the BND the professor said the attack will occur at Berlin Brandenburg Airport, but Carrie finds clues in Qasim's apartment suggesting the target is actually the Hauptbahnhof train station. She spots Qasim at the station and pursues him alone, texting Saul that Allison misled them; Saul receives the text and finds that Allison has escaped from her hospital room.
60	12	"A False Glimmer"	Lesli Linka Glatter	Liz Flahive & Alex Gansa & Ron Nyswaner	December 20, 2015	5WAH12	2.07
In a subway tunnel, Carrie convinces Qasim to try to stop the attack, but Bibi shoots Qasim, at which point Carrie intervenes, shooting Bibi dead to prevent him from detonating the device. In exchange for being given witness protection in the U.S., Ivan tells Saul how the SVR plans to extract Allison; Saul and his team intercept a car carrying her out of Germany and kill everyone in it. Numan is arrested by the BND; by threatening to have him deported to Turkey, where he would be killed, Astrid coerces Laura into making a public statement denouncing Faisal as a terrorist, thereby avoiding another scandal for the BND. Carrie attempts to rekindle her relationship with Jonas, but he declines out of concern for his family's safety. Saul attempts to convince Carrie to rejoin the CIA, but she rebuffs him. Quinn suffers a possibly fatal brain hemorrhage. Dar Adal gives Carrie a letter Quinn wrote her, in which he expressed his love for her, before departing for Syria. Carrie continues watching over him in the hospital.

== Production ==
The series was renewed for a 12-episode fifth season on November 10, 2014. In April 2015, it was confirmed the entire season would be filmed in Potsdam, Germany, at Studio Babelsberg (with the exception of on-location shooting), making it the first American TV series to film an entire season there. In June 2015, four new series regular roles were announced, including Sebastian Koch, Miranda Otto, Alexander Fehling and Sarah Sokolovic. Production began in Berlin on June 2, 2015. Executive producers for the fifth season are Alex Gansa, Howard Gordon, Gideon Raff, Alexander Cary, Chip Johannessen, Meredith Stiehm, Patrick Harbinson, Lesli Linka Glatter, Avi Nir, and Ran Telem.

== Reception ==
=== Critical reception ===
The fifth season received positive reviews from critics. On Metacritic, it has a score of 76 out of 100 based on 17 reviews, indicating "generally favorable" reviews. On Rotten Tomatoes, the season received an 88% rating based on 171 reviews with an average rating of 8/10. The critical consensus reads "Homeland re-energizes itself in season five by setting up a twisty Berlin-set spy thriller that spotlights Carrie's questionable ethics more than ever." Verne Gay of Newsday gave it an "A" grade and wrote that it's "Smart, taut, engaging and propulsive. The fifth looks terrific." Ben Travers of Indiewire gave it an "A−" grade and wrote that "If last season was the redux, then Season 5 is peak Homeland."

=== Accolades ===
For the 22nd Screen Actors Guild Awards, the cast was nominated for Best Drama Ensemble, Claire Danes was nominated for Best Drama Actress, and the series was nominated for Best Stunt Team. For the 42nd People's Choice Awards, Homeland won for Favorite Premium Cable Show. The American Film Institute named it on their list of the best television programs of 2015. For the 68th Directors Guild of America Awards, Lesli Linka Glatter was nominated for Outstanding Directing – Drama Series for "The Tradition of Hospitality". For the 20th Satellite Awards, Claire Danes won for Best Actress in a Drama Series. For the 68th Primetime Emmy Awards, the series received four nominations: Outstanding Drama Series, Claire Danes for Outstanding Lead Actress in a Drama Series, Lesli Linka Glatter for Outstanding Directing for a Drama Series for "The Tradition of Hospitality", and David Klein for Outstanding Cinematography for a Single-Camera Series for "The Tradition of Hospitality".
