= New Normal (Homeland) =

- Homeland episode
- Episode no.: Season 5 Episode 10
- Directed by: Dan Attias
- Written by: Meredith Stiehm; Charlotte Stoudt
- Production code: 5WAH10
- Original air date: December 6, 2015
- Running time: 52 minutes

Guest appearances
- Nina Hoss as Astrid; Mark Ivanir as Ivan Krupin; René Ifrah as Bibi Hamed; John Getz as Joe Crocker; Morocco Omari as Conrad Fuller

Episode chronology
← Previous "The Litvinov Ruse"	Next → "Our Man in Damascus"
- Homeland season 5

"New Normal" is the tenth episode of the fifth season of the American television drama series Homeland, and the 58th episode overall. It premiered on Showtime on December 6, 2015.

== Plot ==
Saul (Mandy Patinkin) is absolved when Krupin (Mark Ivanir) admits that the Russians orchestrated the bombing of General Youssef's plane. Carrie (Claire Danes) and Saul are convinced of Allison's (Miranda Otto) guilt, and become frustrated when Dar Adal (F. Murray Abraham) refuses to make a final judgment without more evidence. Dar also suggests to Saul that quietly shuffling Allison down the ranks of the CIA might be a better solution politically than the massive scandal that would erupt if it was exposed that a Russian agent had risen to CIA station chief. Saul attempts to get a confession out of Allison, but when recounting the deaths of CIA colleagues he believes to be attributable to Allison, he explodes in rage at her and is taken away by security.

Bibi Hamed (René Ifrah) releases a video to the public in which he demands that the UNSC officially recognize the Islamic State, or he will unleash a chemical attack on a major European city in 24 hours. Also included is footage of the effects of the sarin gas on Quinn (Rupert Friend). Carrie and Astrid (Nina Hoss), assuming Quinn to have been killed by the gas, repeatedly watch the grisly video looking for clues to where it was recorded. They make note of a mosaic on the floor which the BND is able to trace to a specific artist.

Laura (Sarah Sokolovic) and Jonas (Alexander Fehling) interview a suspected jihadist, Faisal Marwan, who was freed by the German government along with Zayd. Faisal is looking to file a suit against the German government. Faisal also reveals that Zayd told him about an attack in Berlin. Unsure of what to do with the info, Otto (Sebastian Koch) calls Saul for help. He agrees to turn over Faisal but asks Saul to guarantee his safety. Faisal is captured by BND agents once he leaves the building.

Bibi learns that an empty container of atropine was found, and realizes it was administered to Quinn. To flush out the traitor, he orders a search of everyone's bags. Much to Qasim's (Alireza Bayram) surprise, Zaheer is killed when his bag has no atropine inside. Bibi later reveals to Qasim that he switched the bags to protect Qasim since he is family but threatens Qasim's life if he is defiant again.

Dar notifies the BND that Quinn had infiltrated a cell in Berlin led by a nephew of Abu Al-Qaduli. With this information, the BND determines Bibi's identity. By cross-referencing locations of Bibi's recent credit card purchases with buildings that feature the work of the artist, the BND is able to narrow its search to a handful of locations. When investigating one of the addresses, Carrie and Astrid find Quinn barely clinging to life, as well as the body of Zaheer. Quinn is taken to a hospital and placed in intensive care.

== Production ==
The episode was directed by Dan Attias and co-written by executive producer Meredith Stiehm and Charlotte Stoudt.

== Reception ==
=== Reviews ===
The episode received a rating of 64% with an average score of 6.8 out of 10 on the review aggregator Rotten Tomatoes, with the site's consensus stating "'New Normal' takes an exciting new turn but at the expense of a long-gestating spy story set up by Homeland's previous episodes".

Price Peterson of New York Magazine rated the episode 4 out of 5 stars while remarking on its effectiveness in connecting the season's plot lines and conveying the horror of the characters' circumstances. Scott Collura of IGN rated the episode 8.0 out of 10, saying that the key scenes involving Allison and Quinn were compelling, but also noting that it "felt a little desperate" in integrating Quinn with the other lead characters. Ethan Renner of The Baltimore Sun felt that the episode was "somewhat of a letdown", citing some "clunky plot devices" and one-dimensionality of the Jihadist group's characters.

=== Ratings ===
The original broadcast was watched by 1.74 million viewers, an increase in viewership from the previous week of 1.42 million viewers.
