= Super Powers (Homeland) =

- Homeland episode
- Episode no.: Season 5 Episode 3
- Directed by: Keith Gordon
- Written by: Alex Gansa; Meredith Stiehm
- Production code: 5WAH03
- Original air date: October 18, 2015
- Running time: 60 minutes

Guest appearances
- Suraj Sharma as Aayan Ibrahim; Nina Hoss as Astrid; Atheer Adel as Numan; Sven Schelker as Korzenik; Allan Corduner as Etai Luskin; Micah Hauptman as Mills; William R. Moses as Scott; Steve Nicolson as Boris

Episode chronology
← Previous "The Tradition of Hospitality"	Next → "Why Is This Night Different?"
- Homeland season 5

"Super Powers" is the third episode of the fifth season of the American television drama series Homeland, and the 51st episode overall. It premiered on Showtime on October 18, 2015.

== Plot ==
Carrie Mathison (Claire Danes) and Jonas (Alexander Fehling) retreat to a secluded cabin. In order to solve who is trying to kill her, Carrie elects to temporarily go off her bi-polar medications, feeling her intellect is sharper without them. As they investigate Carrie's past, Jonas is confronted with the knowledge that 167 civilians were killed by actions authorized by Carrie while in Kabul, which leads to an argument. Jonas leaves Carrie alone for the night, during which Carrie gets drunk.

Saul Berenson (Mandy Patinkin) meets with Otto Düring (Sebastian Koch) to ask about Carrie's current whereabouts, but gets no answers. Saul then gives Allison Carr (Miranda Otto) the news that she will be remaining in Berlin as station chief, despite the demands of the BND. A subsequent scene reveals that Saul and Allison have developed a sexual relationship following Saul's recent divorce.

In order to determine Carrie's location, Peter Quinn (Rupert Friend) kidnaps Jonas' son and leaves him tied up in a van in a location where he will eventually be found, with the plan of tracing the eventual phone call to alert Jonas.

Numan (Atheer Adel) makes contact with Laura Sutton (Sarah Sokolovic) and attempts to give her the remaining CIA documents, but when Laura later loads the USB drive on her computer, she finds nothing. Numan is met with hostility when he tells fellow hacker Korzenik (Sven Schelker) that he gave everything to Laura. Korzenik, having switched the USB drives and now in possession of the documents, offers to sell them to a Russian diplomat who frequents the brothel.

When Jonas returns in the morning, he finds Carrie incoherent and forces her to take her medication. Jonas gets a call from his ex-wife about his son being missing. Carrie fears that it must be a ruse orchestrated by her would-be assassin. Jonas leaves, while Carrie hides in the nearby forest armed with a rifle. After nightfall, Quinn arrives and is shot in the back by Carrie. Quinn – not disabled by the shot due to wearing body armor – flanks Carrie, grabs her from behind and chokes her unconscious.

== Production ==
The episode was directed by Keith Gordon and co-written by executive producers Alex Gansa and Meredith Stiehm.

== Reception ==
=== Reviews ===
With 9 positive reviews out of 11, the episode received a rating of 82% with an average score of 7.6 out of 10 on the review aggregator Rotten Tomatoes, with the site's consensus stating "Carrie's in the throes of madness in 'Super Powers', and the result is an intense installment that harkens back to Homeland's best stretches while promising intriguing new wrinkles."

IGN's Scott Collura rated the episode an 8.3 out of 10, praising Claire Danes' performance as award-worthy, and noting how the episode effectively explored how Carrie's past exploits affect her now.

Ben Travers of IndieWire gave the episode a 'B+' grade, describing Danes' portrayal of Carrie Mathison "believable not only as an authentic human being, but also as a broken killing machine trying to put the parts back together for a better purpose".

=== Ratings ===
The original broadcast was watched by 1.11 million viewers, a decrease in viewership from the previous week of 1.40 million viewers.
