= Our Man in Damascus =

- Homeland episode
- Episode no.: Season 5 Episode 11
- Directed by: Seith Mann
- Written by: David Fury
- Production code: 5WAH11
- Original air date: December 13, 2015
- Running time: 60 minutes

Guest appearances
- Atheer Adel as Numan; Nina Hoss as Astrid; René Ifrah as Bibi; Rus Blackwell as surgical doctor; Rachid Sabitri as Dr. Aziz; Stefanie Mueller as Erna Richter; Morocco Omari as Conrad Fuller

Episode chronology
← Previous "New Normal"	Next → "A False Glimmer"
- Homeland season 5

"Our Man in Damascus" is the eleventh episode of the fifth season of the American television drama series Homeland, and the 59th episode overall. It premiered on Showtime on December 13, 2015.

== Plot ==
Carrie (Claire Danes) and Saul (Mandy Patinkin) ask doctors to revive Quinn (Rupert Friend) to query him for information on the impending terrorist attack, but Quinn is unresponsive and goes into respiratory arrest. When Carrie is told that Quinn's bullet wound was expertly treated, she begins asking her contacts for information on an underground doctor in the area where Quinn went missing. Following a tip from Al-Amin, she tracks down Dr. Hussein, who brings Carrie to Qasim's (Alireza Baryam) apartment where the terrorist cell had been residing. In the apartment, Carrie finds extensive research on the Hauptbahnhof train station and heads there to investigate.

Saul tries to coax information out of Faisal Marwan, who has been detained by the BND and subjected to harsh interrogations. Laura Sutton (Sarah Sokolovic) does a live television interview and demands that she be allowed to see Faisal immediately, or else she will release the remaining classified CIA documents in her possession; Saul is summoned away to watch the interview. He returns and finds that Faisal has jumped out of the window and killed himself.

Allison (Miranda Otto) receives her final assignment from the SVR: she must ensure that the chemical attack on Berlin succeeds. When the CIA learns that Zaheer, slain member of the cell, was enrolled at TU Berlin, Allison volunteers to talk to professors she knows there. She is allowed to do so if accompanied by a CIA escort, Conrad Fuller (Morocco Omari). As directed by the SVR, Allison goes directly to mathematics professor Dr. Aziz (Rachid Sabitri). Allison aggressively questions Aziz, and asks for Conrad's gun in order to scare him, but kills Conrad with it instead. She threatens Dr. Aziz until he reveals the target of the chemical attack: the 5:15 train to Potsdam at the Hauptbahnhof. Allison then kills Dr. Aziz, and shoots herself in the shoulder, staging the scene as if Dr. Aziz incited a shootout. After phoning Astrid (Nina Hoss), she is promptly taken to a hospital. She lies to Astrid, saying she learned that Berlin Brandenburg Airport is the target. The BND begins coordinating a full evacuation there.

Saul starts to question Allison as to what happened at the university but is interrupted when a doctor arrives to drain her wound. Bibi's team enters the train station. Posing as employees, they start closing and locking access gates. Referencing a photo she took from the apartment, Carrie spots Qasim. While attempting to get a text message to Saul, she loses track of Qasim's whereabouts. When some bystanders tell her that a man jumped down to the subway tracks, Carrie ventures into the tunnel with gun drawn. Saul receives Carrie's text and rushes back to Allison's hospital room only to discover that she is gone.

== Production ==
The episode was directed by Seith Mann and written by David Fury.

== Reception ==
=== Reviews ===
The episode received a rating of 75% with an average score of 7.8 out of 10 on the review aggregator Rotten Tomatoes, with the site's consensus stating "As 'Our Man in Damascus' sets the ticking clock for Carrie, Homeland strands a few ongoing plots to make room for an explosive season finale".

The Baltimore Sun's Ethan Renner had high praise, calling it "an awesome episode, packing the best of Homeland into one of the most intense, dramatic hours of television all year". Price Peterson of New York Magazine rated the episode 5 out of 5 stars, describing it as "less a standalone episode than an hour of increasingly fraught, tension-filled moments barreling toward a climax" while "even the episode's quietest moments were pregnant with dread". In addition, Peterson considered the scene where Allison kills Conrad and Dr. Aziz as "one of the most vivid, riveting scenes in Homeland history". Aaron Riccio of Slant Magazine had a less favorable view of the episode, finding the motivations of several characters to be questionable.

=== Ratings ===
The original broadcast was watched by 1.84 million viewers, an increase in viewership from the previous week of 1.74 million viewers.
