= Oriole (Homeland) =

- Homeland episode
- Episode no.: Season 5 Episode 7
- Directed by: Lesli Linka Glatter
- Written by: Alex Gansa; Patrick Harbinson
- Production code: 5WAH07
- Original air date: November 15, 2015
- Running time: 50 minutes

Guest appearances
- Atheer Adel as Numan; Mark Ivanir as Ivan Krupin; René Ifrah as Bibi; Allan Corduner as Etai Luskin; Ori Yaniv as Esam; Makram Khoury as Samir Khalil; Morocco Omari as Conrad Fuller; Darwin Shaw as Ahmed Nazari

Episode chronology
← Previous "Parabiosis"	Next → "All About Allison"
- Homeland season 5

"Oriole" is the seventh episode of the fifth season of the American television drama series Homeland, and the 55th episode overall. It premiered on Showtime on November 15, 2015.

== Plot ==
As Carrie (Claire Danes) reviews the hundreds of documents, she finds one outlining an incident where an informant named "Touchstone" attempted to contact "Oriole", which was a code name of Carrie's. Carrie phones "Touchstone" a.k.a. Samir Khalil (Makram Khoury), an Iraqi national. Samir reports to her that he saw Ahmed Nazari (Darwin Shaw), a corrupt Iraqi lawyer who was presumed dead, in Iraq five months prior. Carrie resolves to track down Nazari and find out what he knows. With the help of Numan (Atheer Adel), they discover that Nazari's supposed widow is living in Amsterdam.

Bibi (René Ifrah) asks Quinn (Rupert Friend) to guide his group to the Syrian border via Turkey. Bibi stresses that he can pay handsomely, as his uncle is Abu Al-qaduli, a deputy emir. Quinn reaches out to Dar Adal (F. Murray Abraham) and informs him of his opportunity to get close to Al-qaduli, a CIA kill target.

Saul (Mandy Patinkin), having been caught taking a copy of the leaked documents out of the station, is subjected to a battery of interrogations by Dar Adal. Allison (Miranda Otto) offers to take Saul back to his hotel room to get him to confide. In the room, Saul admits to Allison that he delivered the documents to Carrie. Allison excuses herself and has a panic attack. She then reports back to Krupin (Mark Ivanir) that Carrie is confirmed to be alive and likely headed to Amsterdam. In Amsterdam, Carrie breaks into the house of Nazari, finding a safe she cannot get into, and a laptop which she takes with her. Two men, sent by Krupin, enter the house and notice the broken window. Carrie watches as one of them takes something out of the safe; she then flees the house, managing to avoid their gunshots.

Jonas (Alexander Fehling) visits Otto Düring's compound to look for Carrie. As they talk about her, Düring (Sebastian Koch) reveals that he does not plan on renewing Carrie's contract at the foundation, due to her being "unbalanced".

Dar Adal orders that Saul be flown back to Langley. As Saul is monitored by guards in his room, he makes a phone call for his laundry, which turns out to be a coded distress call. As Saul is escorted out of the building, he is nabbed by a group of armed, masked men who drive away with him. They deliver Saul to Etai Luskin (Allan Corduner), who greets Saul warmly and asks what they are doing next. Saul responds "I don't know. I've never defected before".

Carrie calls Allison, saying that she'd like to ask some questions about the latter's tenure in Baghdad. They agree to meet.

== Production ==
The episode was directed by executive producer Lesli Linka Glatter, and co-written by showrunner Alex Gansa and executive producer Patrick Harbinson.

== Reception ==
=== Reviews ===
The episode received a rating of 92% on the review aggregator Rotten Tomatoes, with the site's consensus stating "In the action-packed 'Oriole,' Homeland brings Carrie and Allison together with a surprising turn of events."

Price Peterson of New York Magazine rated the episode 4 out of 5 stars, with the summation that it was "full of fascinating character moments and crackerjack suspense sequences, and on the whole brought together disparate elements in a highly satisfying way". Entertainment Weekly's Shirley Li praised the Allison Carr character, stating "Miranda Otto has been knocking her performance out of the park, but Allison, as a character, has also proved a fascinating foil to Carrie." Judith Warner of The New York Times highlighted the interplay between Allison and her handler Krupin as a particularly effective scene.

=== Ratings ===
The original broadcast was watched by 1.348 million viewers, a small decrease in viewership from the previous week of 1.35 million viewers.
