= All About Allison =

- Homeland episode
- Episode no.: Season 5 Episode 8
- Directed by: Dan Attias
- Written by: Ron Nyswaner
- Production code: 5WAH08
- Original air date: November 22, 2015
- Running time: 52 minutes

Guest appearances
- Atheer Adel as Numan; Mark Ivanir as Ivan Krupin; René Ifrah as Bibi; Allan Corduner as Etai Luskin; Micah Hauptman as Mills; Makram Khoury as Samir Khalil; Oshri Cohen as Igal; Darwin Shaw as Ahmed Nazari; Hadar Ratzon-Rotem as Tova

Episode chronology
← Previous "Oriole"	Next → "The Litvinov Ruse"
- Homeland season 5

"All About Allison" is the eighth episode of the fifth season of the American television drama series Homeland, and the 56th episode overall. It premiered on Showtime on November 22, 2015.

== Plot ==
=== 2005 flashback ===
In flashbacks, Carrie Mathison (Claire Danes) arrives in Baghdad for the first time. She is there to replace Allison Carr (Miranda Otto), a case officer who is frustrated with the futility of the situation in Iraq and has decided to take leave. Allison introduces Carrie to one of their most valuable assets, Iraqi attorney Ahmed Nazari (Darwin Shaw), though Ahmed voices his refusal to work with anyone other than Allison. Allison and Ahmed meet privately, where Ahmed indicates romantic feelings for Allison and reveals he has systematically stolen $8 million from the Ministry of Justice. When Allison agrees to run away with him, Russian intelligence agent Krupin (Mark Ivanir) enters the room. Krupin points out that everything in the room has been recorded and hints that Allison could face federal prison. If Allison agrees to become a double agent for the SVR instead, he offers her half of the money along with mutual information exchange that will help her climb the ranks of the CIA.

=== Present-day ===
Saul (Mandy Patinkin) is detained while Mossad negotiates with the CIA to arrange his return. When Etai (Allan Corduner) gets word that a deal has been reached, he helps Saul escape the premises.

During a stop for supplies, Quinn (Rupert Friend) gets suspicious of the jihadist group he is escorting to Syria. When he goes to investigate what is being loaded onto their truck, one of the men knocks him out. Bibi (René Ifrah) remarks to a confused compatriot that they are going back to Berlin, as was always the true plan. Quinn wakes up later, finding himself tied up in the back of the now moving truck, where he can see a supply of chemical weapons.

Carrie arranges a public meeting with Allison where she pleads with Allison to review the case files regarding Ahmed Nazari. A sniper is positioned to shoot Carrie on Allison's signal, but she opts against it. When Numan (Atheer Adel) successfully hacks into Ahmed's laptop, Carrie takes note of a photo of Ahmed at a beachside bar. Carrie recalls a conversation in Baghdad where Allison mentioned a bar in Saint Lucia. After a web search confirms it to be the same bar, a shocked Carrie says "Oh my God... Allison."

== Production ==
The episode was directed by Dan Attias, and written by co-executive producer Ron Nyswaner.

== Reception ==
=== Reviews ===
The episode received a rating of 82% with an average score of 7.8 out of 10 on the review aggregator Rotten Tomatoes, with the site's consensus stating "Homeland finally provides a compelling backstory for Allison's character, though too few narrative pieces snap into place in 'All About Allison'".

Judith Warner of The New York Times commended the way in which Carrie and Allison's perspectives were integrated in the flashback scenes, while also opining that Carrie's discovery of Allison's secret was "a bit too much of a shortcut". TV.com's Cory Barker said of Allison's backstory: "this reveal did what all great flashback reveals do: made the audience reconsider some of the assumptions they had about a presumably villainous or treacherous character". Cynthia Littleton of Variety praised the episode's cinematography, and also described Miranda Otto's performance as "fantastic in the episode, letting her cool exterior melt just enough for us to get a glimpse inside".

=== Ratings ===
The original broadcast was watched by 1.47 million viewers, an increase in viewership from the previous week of 1.35 million viewers.
