= Separation anxiety (disambiguation) =

Separation anxiety disorder is a psychological condition.

Separation anxiety may also refer to:

- Separation anxiety in dogs, in which a dog exhibits distress when separated from its handler

== Television and film ==
- Separation Anxiety (TV series), a 2016 American game show
- "Separation Anxiety" (Dawson's Creek), a 2001 television episode
- "Separation Anxiety" (Homeland), a 2015 television episode
- "Separation Anxiety" (The King of Queens), a 2001 television episode
- "Separation Anxiety" (That's So Raven), a 2003 television episode

== Other uses ==
- Separation Anxieties, a 2000 album by 12 Rods
- Separation Anxiety, a 2009 mixtape by Cadence Weapon
- Venom: Separation Anxiety, a 1994–1995 comic book series
  - Venom/Spider-Man: Separation Anxiety, a 1995 video game based on the comics
