= Separation Anxiety (Homeland) =

- Homeland episode
- Episode no.: Season 5 Episode 1
- Directed by: Lesli Linka Glatter
- Written by: Chip Johannessen; Ted Mann
- Production code: 5WAH01
- Original air date: October 4, 2015
- Running time: 51 minutes

Guest appearances
- Nina Hoss as Astrid; Atheer Adel as Numan; Sven Schelker as Korzenik; Micah Hauptman as Mills; John Getz as Joe Crocker

Episode chronology
← Previous "Long Time Coming"	Next → "The Tradition of Hospitality"
- Homeland season 5

"Separation Anxiety" is the fifth-season premiere of the American television drama series Homeland, and the 49th episode overall. It premiered on Showtime on October 4, 2015.

== Plot ==
Approximately 28 months after the events of the end of Season 4, Carrie Mathison (Claire Danes), has left the CIA and is working as the head of security for the philanthropic Düring Foundation in Berlin. Carrie is informed by boss Otto Düring (Sebastian Koch) that he intends to travel to a Syrian refugee camp in Lebanon in order to secure relief funds from several benefactors. He gives Carrie three days to prepare Düring and herself for this extremely dangerous trip. Carrie first consults with CIA Berlin station chief Allison Carr (Miranda Otto), requesting intelligence on the current situation in Lebanon, and is taken aback when Allison offers nothing unless Carrie reciprocates with inside information on the Düring Foundation's dealings. Carrie leaves and has a tense run-in with Saul (Mandy Patinkin), who sharply criticizes her for leaving the CIA and working for "the other side".

Two hackers in Berlin vandalize an Islamic State recruitment web site. A CIA technician in Berlin, monitoring traffic to this web site, witnesses the breach and probes the hackers' computer in an attempt to identify it. The hackers take this opportunity and counterattack, gaining access to the CIA network and obtaining many classified documents. One of the documents is leaked to Laura Sutton (Sarah Sokolovic), a journalist at the Düring Foundation. The document reveals that German intelligence was subverting their country's privacy laws by hiring the CIA to perform surveillance in Germany and report back information on jihadists who are living there.

When German officials learn from Saul and Allison that the CIA computer network was breached, they immediately call an end to the surveillance program. Saul opts to continue the program independent of the Germans, enlisting Quinn (Rupert Friend) to assassinate confirmed targets, though without any agency support. Quinn readily agrees.

Carrie manages to arrange a meeting with Hezbollah commander Al-Amin where she requests safe passage to the Syrian refugee camp which is under their control. She is seemingly rebuffed when Al-Amin makes note of Carrie's past affiliation with the CIA and ends the conversation. However, Carrie receives a call that night confirming that Otto Düring is now an invited guest of Hezbollah.

== Production ==
The episode was directed by executive producer Lesli Linka Glatter and co-written by executive producer Chip Johannessen and co-executive producer Ted Mann, who joined the writing staff this season.

== Reception ==
=== Reviews ===
With 14 positive reviews out of 15, the episode received a rating of 93% with an average score of 8.2 out of 10 on the review aggregator Rotten Tomatoes, with the site's consensus stating "Homeland sets the table for a thrilling fifth season mired in real-world strife with 'Separation Anxiety', an episode showcasing both Carrie's strengths and flaws."

Price Peterson of New York Magazine rated the episode 4 out of 5 stars, writing that the episode did well to establish Carrie Mathison's new life, adding that "Claire Danes's performance remains a TV marvel". IndieWire's Ben Travers gave the episode a B+ grade, saying that "writers Chip Johannessen and Ted Mann along with director Lesli Linka Glatter do a superb job of foreshadowing the fateful events to come and illustrating where Carrie is, both professionally and emotionally".

=== Ratings ===
The original broadcast was watched by 1.66 million viewers, a slight increase over the fourth-season premiere. Its cumulative viewership across multiple Sunday airings was 2.1 million.
