= 22nd Screen Actors Guild Awards =

- Awarded for: Outstanding motion picture and primetime television performances
- Date: January 30, 2016
- Location: Shrine Auditorium; Los Angeles, California
- Country: United States
- Presented by: SAG-AFTRA
- Website: www.sagawards.org

Television/radio coverage
- Network: TNT and TBS simultaneous broadcast

The 22nd Annual Screen Actors Guild Awards, honoring the best achievements in film and television performances for the year 2015, were presented on January 30, 2016, at the Shrine Auditorium in Los Angeles, California. The ceremony was broadcast on both TNT and TBS 8:00 p.m. EST / 5:00 p.m. PST and the nominees were announced on December 9, 2015.

Carol Burnett was announced as the 2015 SAG Life Achievement Award honoree on July 20, 2015. Idris Elba became the second performer to win two individual awards in a single edition.

It was announced on the live Red Carpet Show that Mad Max: Fury Road had received the Screen Actors Guild Award for Outstanding Performance by a Stunt Ensemble in a Motion Picture and that Game of Thrones had received the Outstanding Performance by a Stunt Ensemble in a Television Series.

== Winners and nominees ==
Winners are listed first and highlighted in boldface.

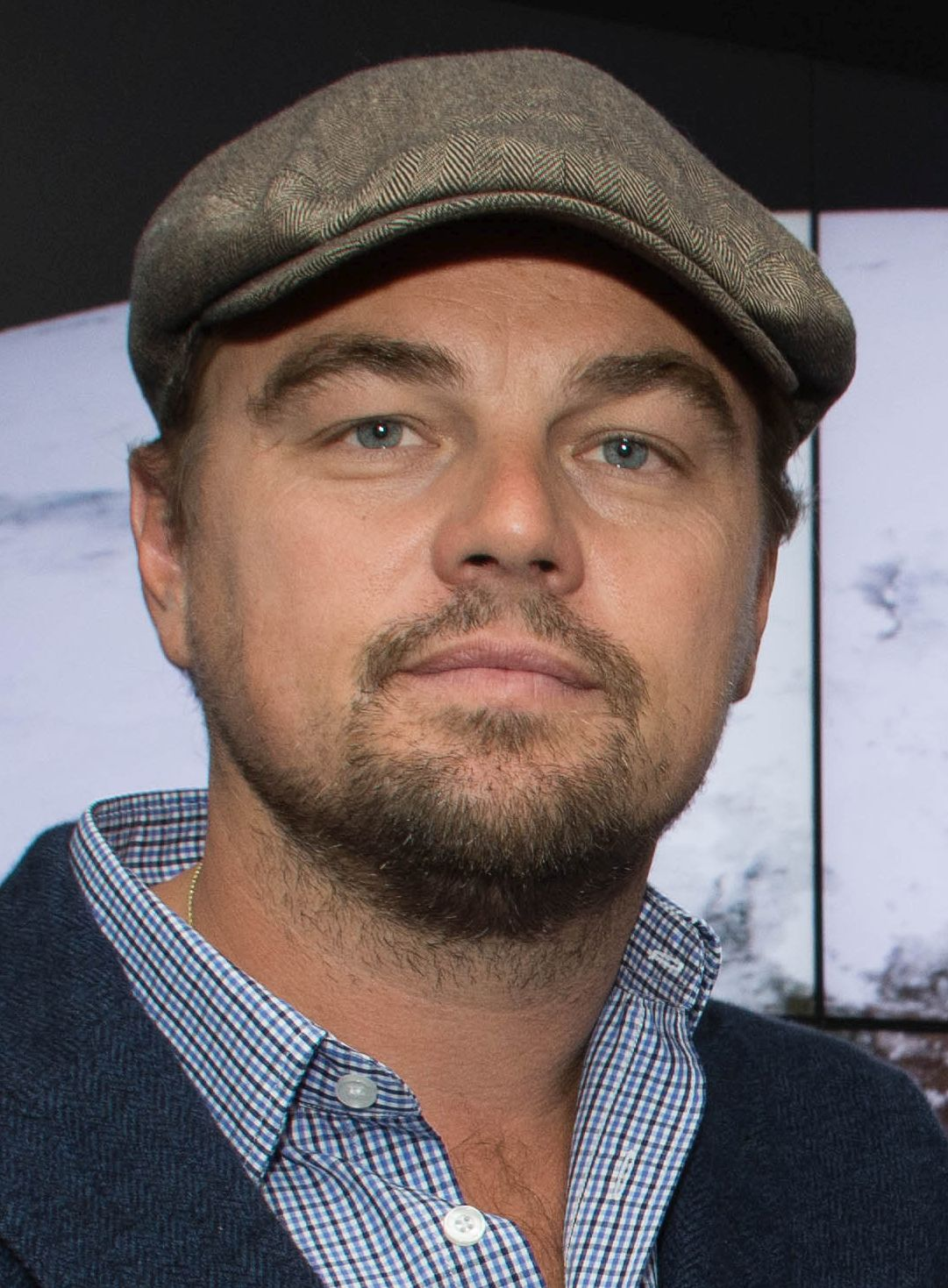
Leonardo DiCaprio, Outstanding Performance by a Male Actor in a Leading Role winner

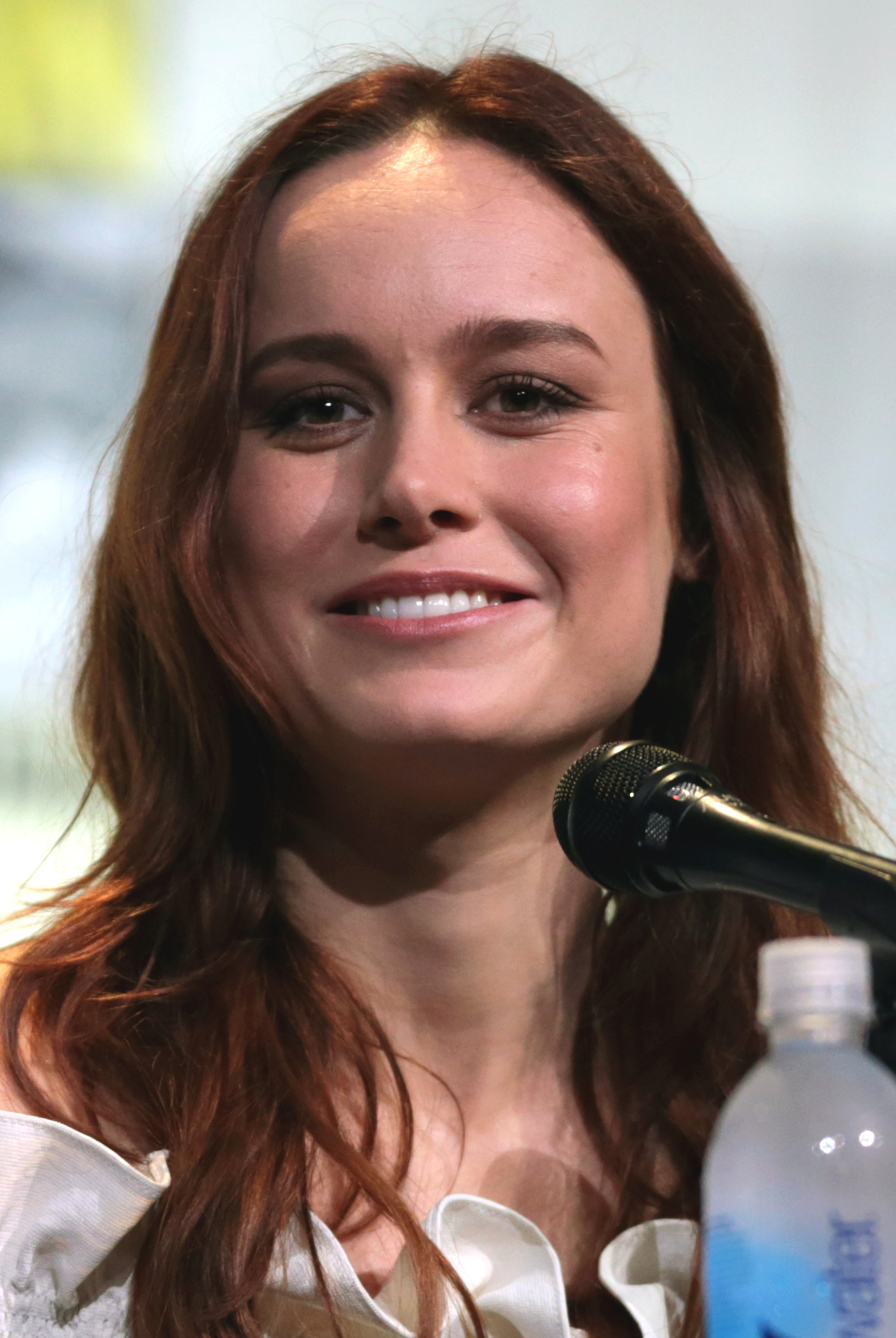
Brie Larson, Outstanding Performance by a Female Actor in a Leading Role winner

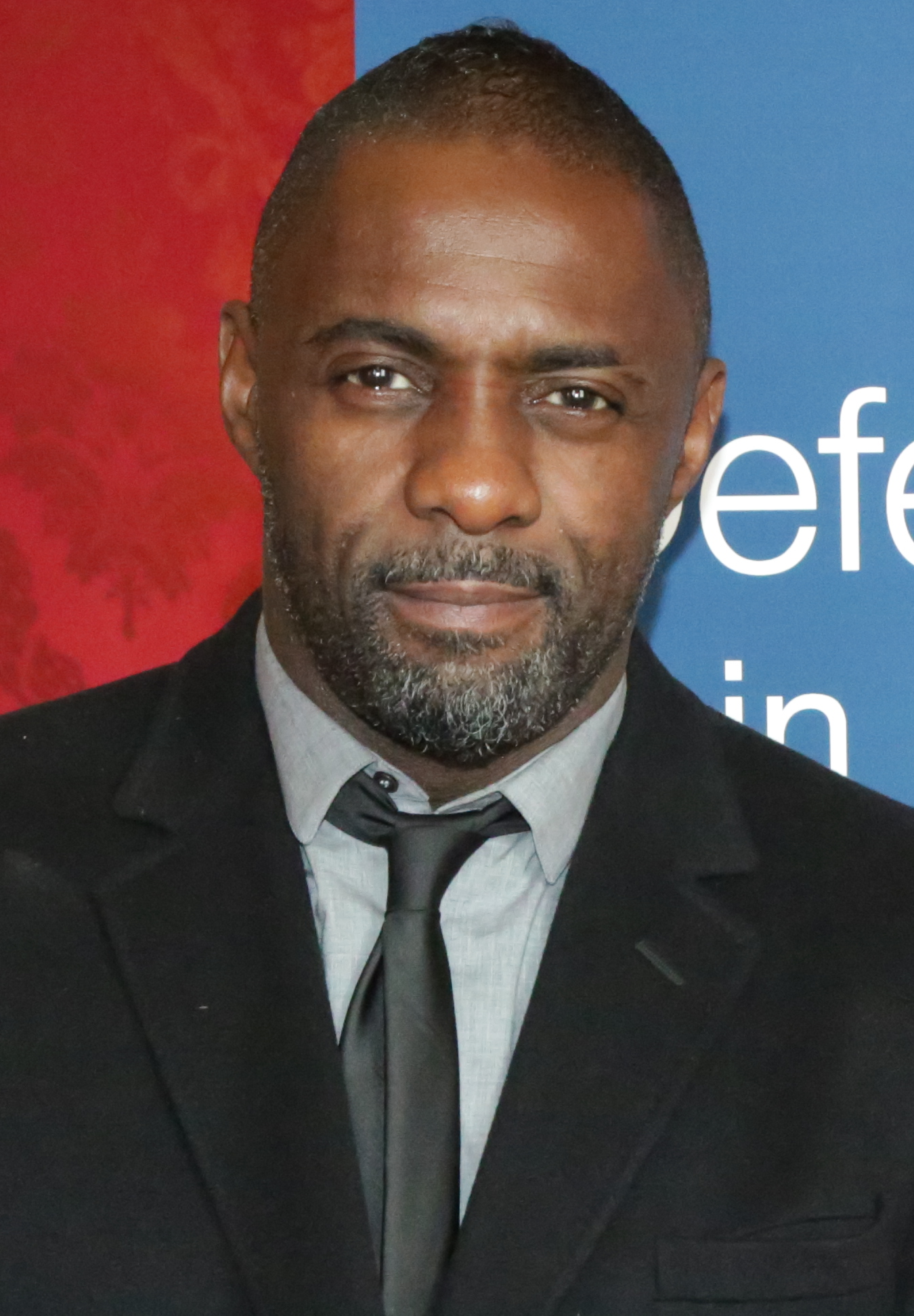
Idris Elba, Outstanding Performance by a Male Actor in a Supporting Role and Outstanding Performance by a Male Actor in a Miniseries or Television Movie winner

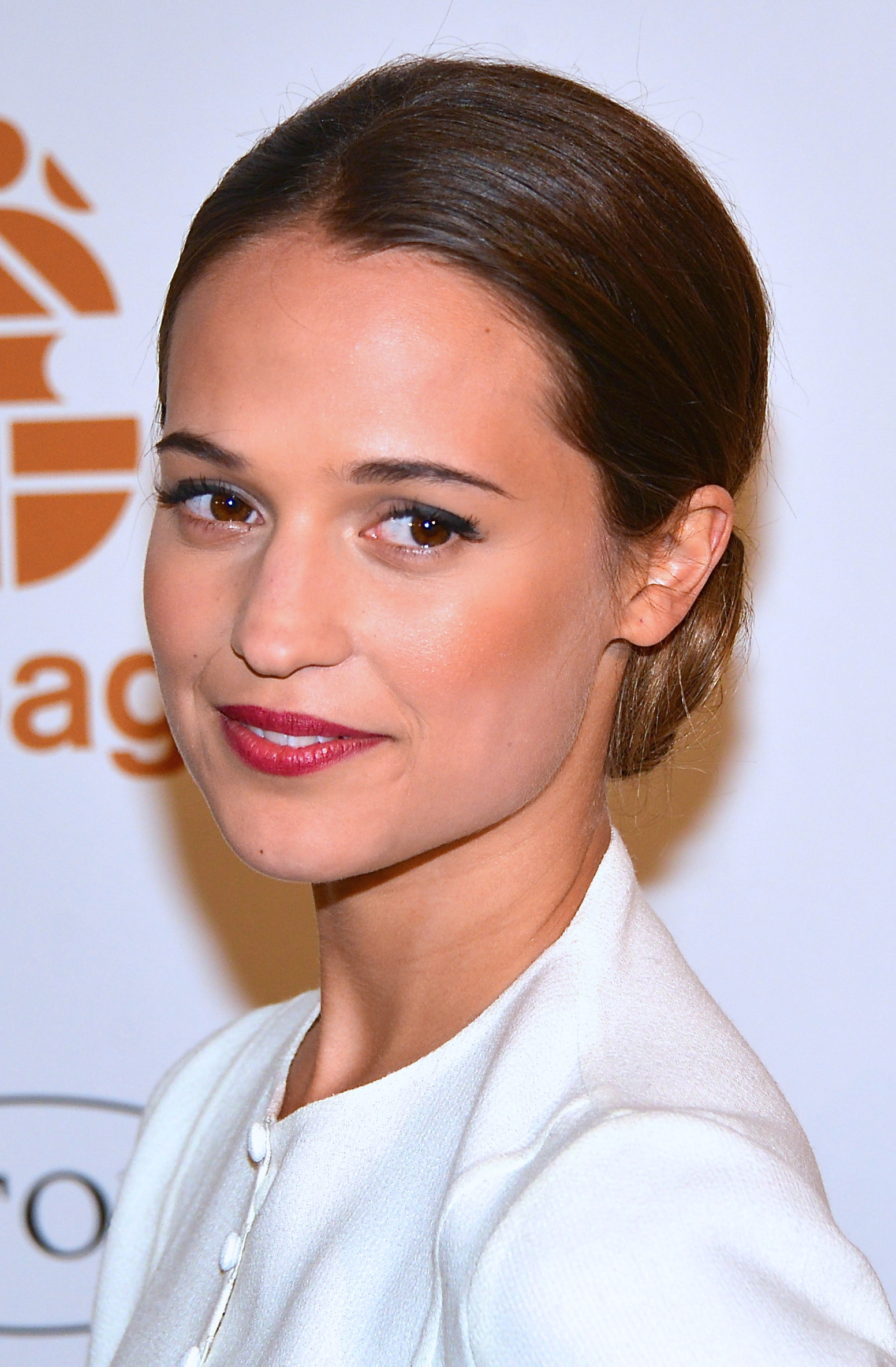
Alicia Vikander, Outstanding Performance by a Female Actor in a Supporting Role winner

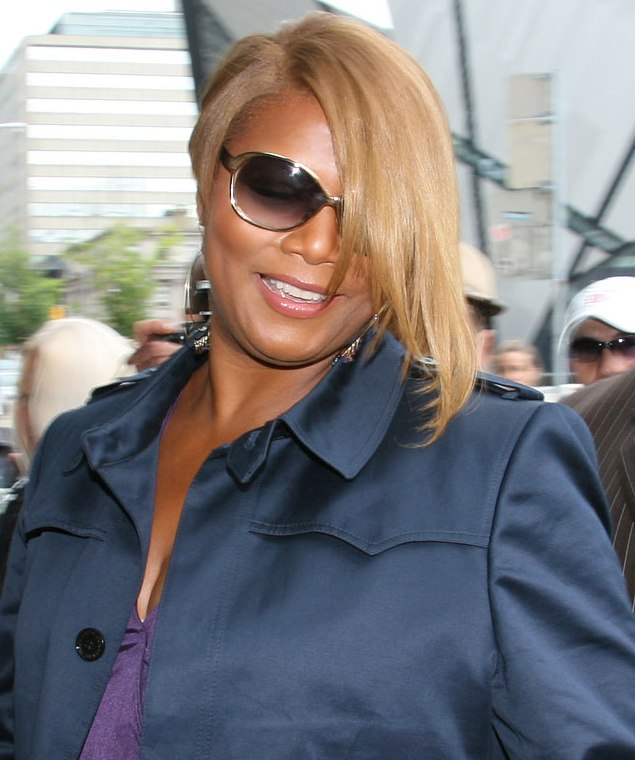
Queen Latifah, Outstanding Performance by a Female Actor in a Miniseries or Television Movie winner

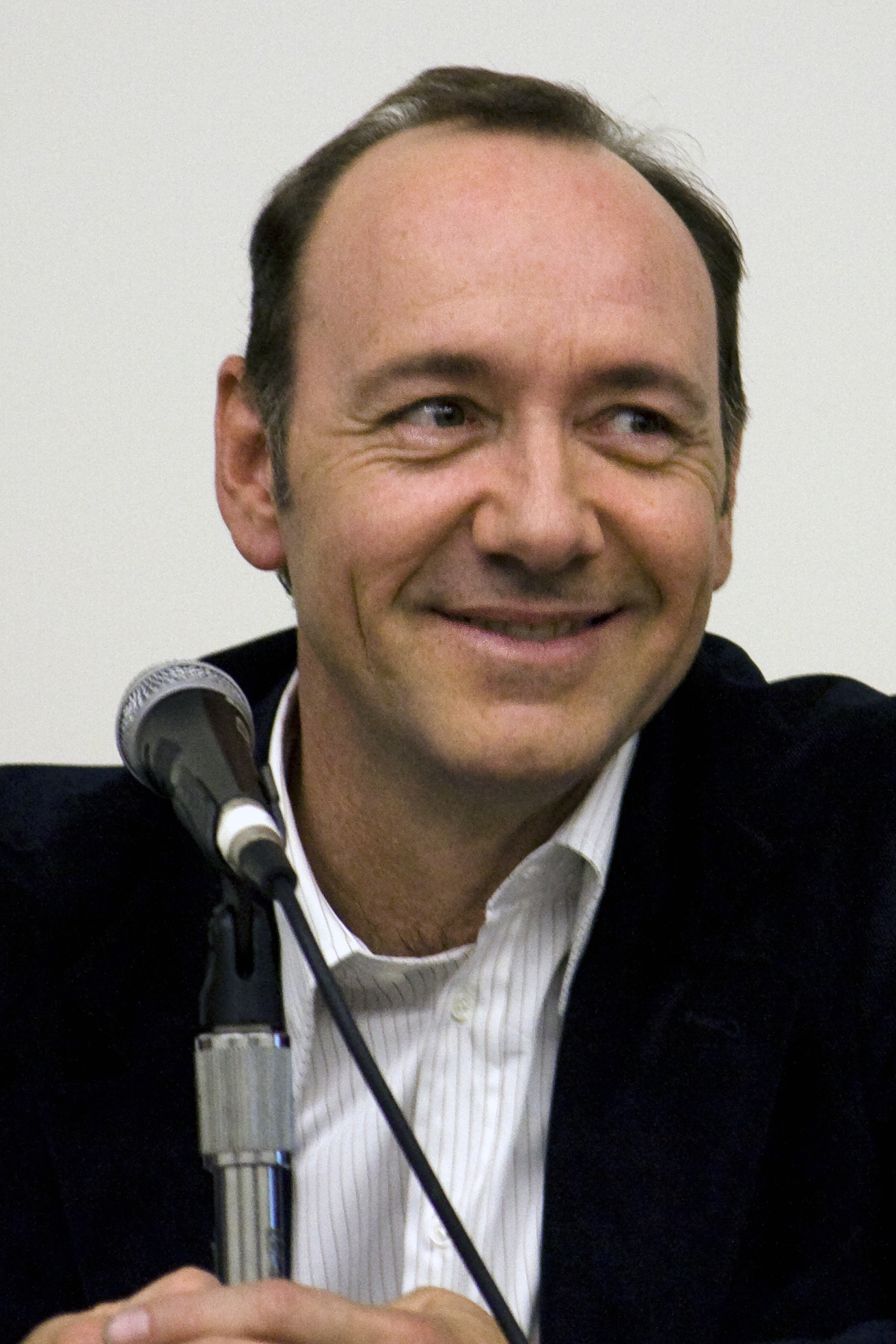
Kevin Spacey, Outstanding Performance by a Male Actor in a Drama Series winner

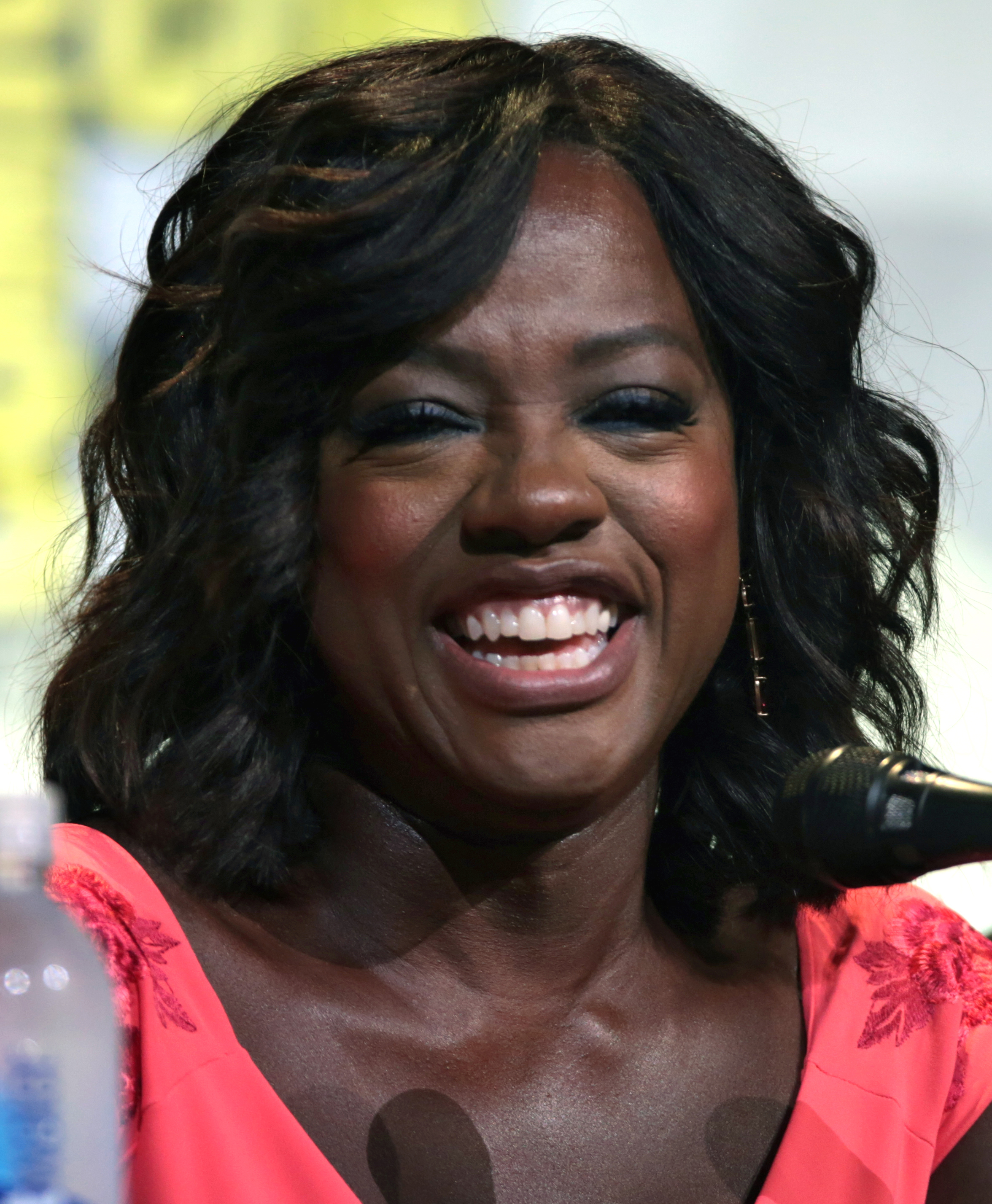
Viola Davis, Outstanding Performance by a Female Actor in a Drama Series winner

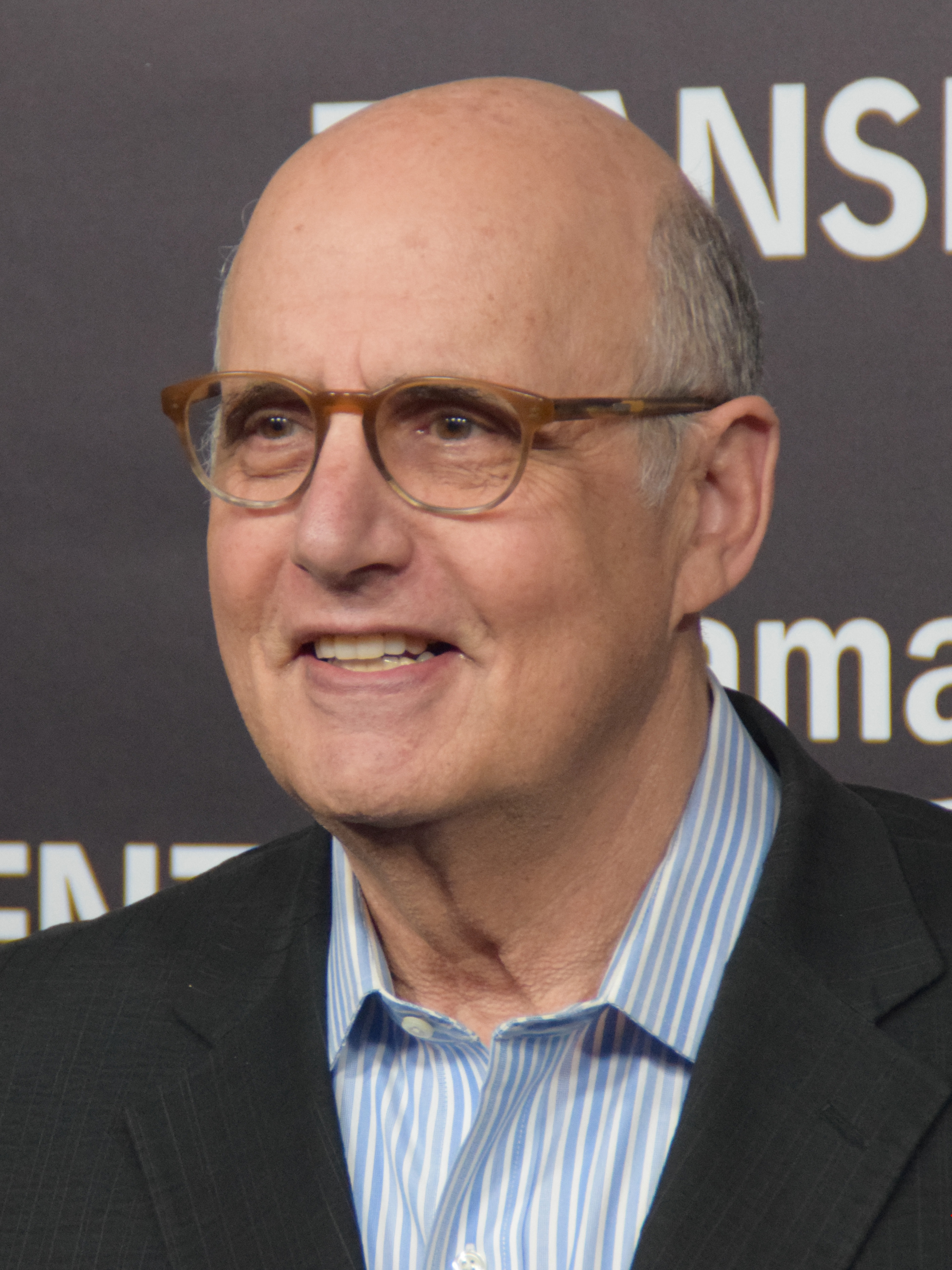
Jeffrey Tambor, Outstanding Performance by a Male Actor in a Comedy Series winner

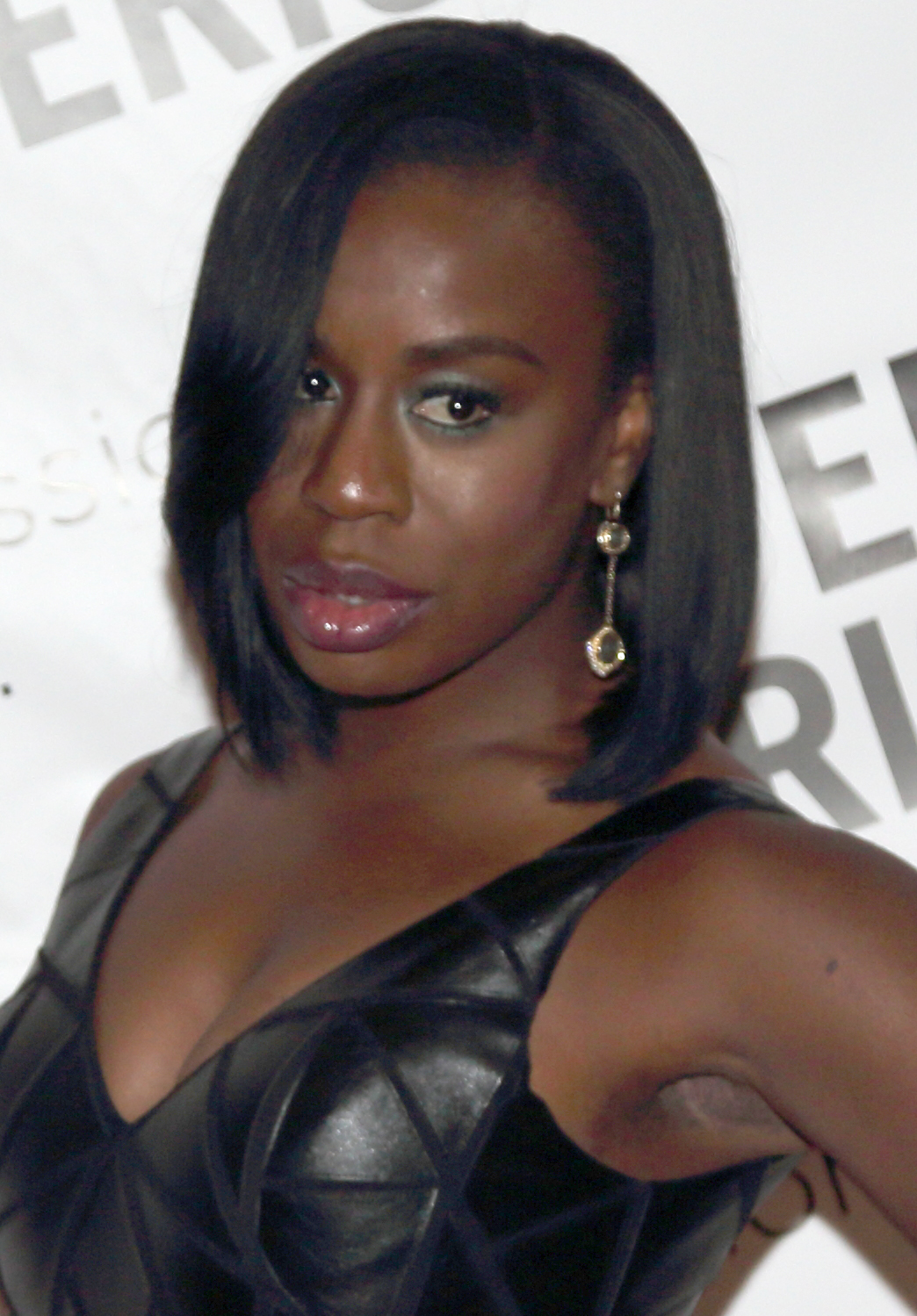
Uzo Aduba, Outstanding Performance by a Female Actor in a Comedy Series winner

=== Film ===
Outstanding Performance by a Male Actor in a Leading Role	Outstanding Performance by a Female Actor in a Leading Role
**Leonardo DiCaprio – The Revenant as Hugh Glass**; Bryan Cranston – Trumbo as Dalton Trumbo; Johnny Depp – Black Mass as James "Whitey" Bulger; Michael Fassbender – Steve Jobs as Steve Jobs; Eddie Redmayne – The Danish Girl as Lili Elbe	**Brie Larson – Room as Joy "Ma" Newsome**; Cate Blanchett – Carol as Carol Aird; Helen Mirren – Woman in Gold as Maria Altmann; Saoirse Ronan – Brooklyn as Eilis Lacey; Sarah Silverman – I Smile Back as Elaine "Laney" Brooks
Outstanding Performance by a Male Actor in a Supporting Role	Outstanding Performance by a Female Actor in a Supporting Role
**Idris Elba – Beasts of No Nation as The Commandant**; Christian Bale – The Big Short as Michael Burry; Mark Rylance – Bridge of Spies as Rudolf Abel; Michael Shannon – 99 Homes as Rick Carver; Jacob Tremblay – Room as Jack Newsome	**Alicia Vikander – The Danish Girl as Gerda Wegener**; Rooney Mara – Carol as Therese Belivet; Rachel McAdams – Spotlight as Sacha Pfeiffer; Helen Mirren – Trumbo as Hedda Hopper; Kate Winslet – Steve Jobs as Joanna Hoffman
Outstanding Performance by a Cast in a Motion Picture
**Spotlight – Billy Crudup, Brian d'Arcy James, Michael Keaton, Rachel McAdams, Mark Ruffalo, Liev Schreiber, John Slattery and Stanley Tucci**; Beasts of No Nation – Abraham Attah, Kurt Egyiawan and Idris Elba; The Big Short – Christian Bale, Steve Carell, Ryan Gosling, Melissa Leo, Hamish Linklater, John Magaro, Brad Pitt, Rafe Spall, Jeremy Strong, Marisa Tomei and Finn Wittrock; Straight Outta Compton – Neil Brown Jr., Paul Giamatti, Corey Hawkins, Aldis Hodge, O'Shea Jackson Jr. and Jason Mitchell; Trumbo – Adewale Akinnuoye-Agbaje, Louis C.K., Bryan Cranston, David James Elliott, Elle Fanning, John Goodman, Diane Lane, Helen Mirren, Michael Stuhlbarg and Alan Tudyk
Outstanding Performance by a Stunt Ensemble in a Motion Picture
**Mad Max: Fury Road**; Everest; Furious 7; Jurassic World; Mission: Impossible – Rogue Nation

=== Television ===
Outstanding Performance by a Male Actor in a Miniseries or Television Movie	Outstanding Performance by a Female Actor in a Miniseries or Television Movie
**Idris Elba – Luther (BBC America) as Detective Chief Inspector John Luther**; Ben Kingsley – Tut (Spike) as Ay; Ray Liotta – Texas Rising (History) as Lorca / Tom Mitchell; Bill Murray – A Very Murray Christmas (Netflix) as Himself; Mark Rylance – Wolf Hall (PBS) as Thomas Cromwell	**Queen Latifah – Bessie (HBO) as Bessie Smith**; Nicole Kidman – Grace of Monaco (Lifetime) as Grace Kelly; Christina Ricci – The Lizzie Borden Chronicles (Lifetime) as Lizzie Borden; Susan Sarandon – The Secret Life of Marilyn Monroe (Lifetime) as Gladys Mortenson; Kristen Wiig – The Spoils Before Dying (IFC) as Delores DeWinter
Outstanding Performance by a Male Actor in a Drama Series	Outstanding Performance by a Female Actor in a Drama Series
**Kevin Spacey – House of Cards (Netflix) as Francis Underwood**; Peter Dinklage – Game of Thrones (HBO) as Tyrion Lannister; Jon Hamm – Mad Men (AMC) as Don Draper; Rami Malek – Mr. Robot (USA Network) as Elliot Alderson; Bob Odenkirk – Better Call Saul (AMC) as Jimmy McGill	**Viola Davis – How to Get Away with Murder (ABC) as Annalise Keating**; Claire Danes – Homeland (Showtime) as Carrie Mathison; Julianna Margulies – The Good Wife (CBS) as Alicia Florrick; Maggie Smith – Downton Abbey (PBS) as Violet, Dowager Countess of Grantham; Robin Wright – House of Cards (Netflix) as Claire Underwood
Outstanding Performance by a Male Actor in a Comedy Series	Outstanding Performance by a Female Actor in a Comedy Series
**Jeffrey Tambor – Transparent (Amazon Prime Video) as Maura Pfefferman**; Ty Burrell – Modern Family (ABC) as Phil Dunphy; Louis C.K. – Louie (FX) as Louie; William H. Macy – Shameless (Showtime) as Frank Gallagher; Jim Parsons – The Big Bang Theory (CBS) as Dr. Sheldon Cooper	**Uzo Aduba – Orange Is the New Black (Netflix) as Suzanne "Crazy Eyes" Warren**; Edie Falco – Nurse Jackie (Showtime) as Jackie Peyton; Ellie Kemper – Unbreakable Kimmy Schmidt (Netflix) as Kimmy Schmidt; Julia Louis-Dreyfus – Veep (HBO) as Selina Meyer; Amy Poehler – Parks and Recreation (NBC) as Leslie Knope
Outstanding Performance by an Ensemble in a Drama Series
**Downton Abbey (PBS) – Hugh Bonneville, Laura Carmichael, Jim Carter, Raquel Cassidy, Brendan Coyle, Tom Cullen, Michelle Dockery, Kevin Doyle, Joanne Froggatt, Lily James, Rob James-Collier, Allen Leech, Phyllis Logan, Elizabeth McGovern, Sophie McShera, Lesley Nicol, Julian Ovenden, David Robb, Maggie Smith and Penelope Wilton**; Game of Thrones (HBO) – Alfie Allen, Ian Beattie, John Bradley-West, Gwendoline Christie, Emilia Clarke, Michael Condron, Nikolaj Coster-Waldau, Ben Crompton, Liam Cunningham, Stephen Dillane, Peter Dinklage, Natalie Dormer, Nathalie Emmanuel, Tara Fitzgerald, Jerome Flynn, Brian Fortune, Joel Fry, Aidan Gillen, Iain Glen, Kit Harington, Lena Headey, Michiel Huisman, Hannah Murray, Brenock O'Connor, Daniel Portman, Iwan Rheon, Owen Teale, Sophie Turner, Carice van Houten, Maisie Williams and Tom Wlaschiha; Homeland (Showtime) – F. Murray Abraham, Atheer Adel, Claire Danes, Alexander Fehling, Rupert Friend, Nina Hoss, René David Ifrah, Mark Ivanir, Sebastian Koch, Miranda Otto, Mandy Patinkin and Sarah Sokolovic; House of Cards (Netflix) – Mahershala Ali, Derek Cecil, Nathan Darrow, Michael Kelly, Elizabeth Marvel, Molly Parker, Jimmi Simpson, Kevin Spacey and Robin Wright; Mad Men (AMC) – Sola Bamis, Stephanie Drake, Jay R. Ferguson, Bruce Greenwood, Jon Hamm, Christina Hendricks, January Jones, Vincent Kartheiser, Elisabeth Moss, Kevin Rahm, Kiernan Shipka, John Slattery, Rich Sommer, Aaron Staton and Mason Vale Cotton
Outstanding Performance by an Ensemble in a Comedy Series
**Orange Is the New Black (Netflix) – Uzo Aduba, Mike Birbiglia, Marsha Stephanie Blake, Danielle Brooks, Laverne Cox, Jackie Cruz, Catherine Curtin, Lea Delaria, Beth Fowler, Kimiko Glenn, Annie Golden, Diane Guerrero, Michael J. Harney, Vicky Jeudy, Lauren Lapkus, Selenis Leyva, Taryn Manning, Joel Marsh Garland, Adrienne C. Moore, Kate Mulgrew, Emma Myles, Matt Peters, Lori Petty, Jessica Pimentel, Dascha Polanco, Laura Prepon, Elizabeth Rodriguez, Ruby Rose, Nick Sandow, Abigail Savage, Taylor Schilling, Constance Shulman, Dale Soules, Yael Stone and Samira Wiley**; The Big Bang Theory (CBS) – Mayim Bialik, Kaley Cuoco, Johnny Galecki, Simon Helberg, Kunal Nayyar, Jim Parsons and Melissa Rauch; Key & Peele (Comedy Central) – Keegan-Michael Key and Jordan Peele; Modern Family (ABC) – Aubrey Anderson-Emmons, Julie Bowen, Ty Burrell, Jesse Tyler Ferguson, Nolan Gould, Sarah Hyland, Ed O'Neill, Rico Rodriguez, Eric Stonestreet, Sofía Vergara and Ariel Winter; Transparent (Prime Video) – Alexandra Billings, Carrie Brownstein, Jay Duplass, Kathryn Hahn, Gaby Hoffmann, Cherry Jones, Amy Landecker, Judith Light, Hari Nef, Emily Robinson and Jeffrey Tambor; Veep (HBO) – Diedrich Bader, Sufe Bradshaw, Anna Chlumsky, Gary Cole, Kevin Dunn, Tony Hale, Hugh Laurie, Julia Louis-Dreyfus, Phil Reeves, Sam Richardson, Reid Scott, Timothy Simons, Sarah Sutherland and Matt Walsh
Outstanding Performance by a Stunt Ensemble in a Television Series
**Game of Thrones (HBO)**; The Blacklist (NBC); Daredevil (Netflix); Homeland (Showtime); The Walking Dead (AMC)

=== Screen Actors Guild Life Achievement Award ===
- Carol Burnett

== Multiple nominations ==
=== Film ===
Nominations	Film
3	Trumbo
2	Beasts of No Nation
2	The Big Short
2	Carol
2	The Danish Girl
2	Room
2	Spotlight
2	Steve Jobs

=== Television ===
Nominations	Program
3	Game of Thrones
3	Homeland
3	House of Cards
2	The Big Bang Theory
2	Downton Abbey
2	Mad Men
2	Modern Family
2	Orange Is the New Black
2	Transparent
2	Veep

== Multiple wins ==
=== Television ===
Wins	Program
2	Orange Is the New Black

== In Memoriam ==
Susan Sarandon introduced the "In Memoriam" segment, honoring the life and career of the actors who died in 2015:

- Omar Sharif
- Anita Ekberg
- Theodore Bikel
- Betsy Palmer
- Taylor Negron
- Anne Meara
- Rod Taylor
- Dean Jones
- Wayne Rogers
- Pat Harrington Jr.
- Marge Royce
- Martin Milner
- Donna Douglas
- Stan Freberg
- Windell Middlebrooks
- George Coe
- John Connell
- Christopher Lee
- Lizabeth Scott
- Dickie Moore
- Roger Rees
- Louis Jourdan
- Gary Owens
- Dick Van Patten
- Geoffrey Lewis
- Richard Dysart
- David Bowie
- Paul Napier
- Elizabeth Wilson
- Jack Larson
- Natalie Cole
- Judy Carne
- Robert Loggia
- Jayne Meadows
- Alex Rocco
- Al Molinaro
- Patrick Macnee
- Fred Dalton Thompson
- David Canary
- Marjorie Lord
- Maureen O'Hara
- Alan Rickman
- Leonard Nimoy
