= September (2003 film) =

2003 film

- Theatrical release poster
- Directed by: Max Färberböck
- Written by: Max Färberböck
- Produced by: Max Färberböck; Martin Hagemann
- Starring: Catharina Schuchmann
- Cinematography: Carl-Friedrich Koschnick
- Edited by: Ewa J. Lind
- Music by: Dario Marianelli
- Distributed by: X Verleih AG (through Warner Bros.)
- Release date: 26 June 2003
- Running time: 115 minutes
- Country: Germany
- Language: German

September is a 2003 German drama film directed by Max Färberböck. It was screened in the Un Certain Regard section at the 2003 Cannes Film Festival. The subject matter is the effect of the September 11 attacks.

== Plot ==
The film takes place in Germany, shortly after the September 11 attacks. Eight individuals of different backgrounds react to the attacks with conflicting emotions and unpredictable behavior. The events have affected their personal lives.

== Cast ==
- Catharina Schuchmann as Julia Scholz
- Justus von Dohnányi as Philipp Scholz
- Nina Proll as Lena
- Jörg Schüttauf as Helmer
- Moritz Rinke as Felix Baumberger
- Sólveig Arnarsdóttir as Susanne
- Stefanie Stappenbeck as Natascha
- René Ifrah as Ashraf
- Anja Kling as Sandra
- Vincent Heppner as Robert
- Aiko Pipo as Patrick
