= The Tradition of Hospitality =

- Homeland episode
- Episode no.: Season 5 Episode 2
- Directed by: Lesli Linka Glatter
- Written by: Patrick Harbinson
- Production code: 5WAH02
- Original air date: October 11, 2015
- Running time: 48 minutes

Guest appearances
- Nina Hoss as Astrid; Alex Lanipekun as Hank Wonham; Atheer Adel as Numan; Sven Schelker as Korzenik; Max Beesley as Mike Brown; Mousa Kraish as Behruz; Assaad Bouab as Waleed

Episode chronology
← Previous "Separation Anxiety"	Next → "Super Powers"
- Homeland season 5

"The Tradition of Hospitality" is the second episode of the fifth season of the American television drama series Homeland, and the 50th episode overall. It premiered on Showtime on October 11, 2015. The Atlantic named it one of the best television episodes of 2015.

== Plot ==
Now in Lebanon, Carrie Mathison (Claire Danes) pays Waleed, a Hezbollah commander, $40,000 in exchange for their protection in the refugee camp. The commander warns that with increasing instability in the area, he can only promise one hour of protection. Carrie and Otto Düring (Sebastian Koch), along with bodyguards from the foundation, enter the camp, where Düring publicly announces his $10 million contribution.

Laura Sutton (Sarah Sokolovic) goes public with the leaked document revealing that the CIA was illegally contracted to spy on German citizens. After a TV interview, she is temporarily detained by Astrid (Nina Hoss) who pressures Laura for her sources. Saul (Mandy Patinkin) informs Allison (Miranda Otto) that she is being recalled from her post in Berlin due to the German chancellor demanding repercussions for the CIA's data breach. Allison reaches out to Dar Adal (F. Murray Abraham) in an attempt to save her job, and floats the idea of Saul being recalled instead.

After Düring wraps up his speech, Carrie and Mike (Max Beesley) eye a suspicious man approaching them. The man takes a hostage and is quickly shot by Mike, a suicide vest visible on his body. Carrie rushes Düring back to their car and they speed away from the scene. When Carrie notices that they are driving into a suspiciously abandoned area, she forces the driver to stop, causing them to stop just short of an IED explosion. Once they get to safety, Carrie decides to stay behind in Beirut to investigate who was behind such an elaborate, premeditated attack. She is later visited by Behruz (Mousa Kraish), an associate of Al-Amin, who reveals that they were betrayed by Waleed, and that Waleed confessed it was Carrie who was the target of the attack, not Düring.

Quinn (Rupert Friend) successfully tracks and kills Fatima, a woman who was recruiting young women to be suicide bombers for the Islamic State. Later on, he picks up a coded message which contains his next assigned kill. He decodes it to discover the name "MATHISON".

== Production ==
The episode was directed by executive producer Lesli Linka Glatter and written by executive producer Patrick Harbinson.

The scenes in the refugee camp on the Syrian/Lebanese border were filmed in a disused animal feed factory outside Berlin. To make it look more authentic, the set designers recruited some local Arabic-speaking graffiti artists. The artists, including Egyptian artist Heba Amin, resentful of what they perceived as the series' racist depiction of Muslim Arabs, spray-painted slogans such as "Homeland is racist," "Homeland is a joke, and it didn’t make us laugh" and "#blacklivesmatter", in an act of culture jamming. These slogans made it onto the show without any of the production staff noticing, resulting in some media outlets ridiculing the show for a lack of basic linguistic knowledge in an area of central interest to the show.

The artists themselves released a statement saying that they sought to disrupt the show because they believed that, to the show's producers, "Arabic script is merely a supplementary visual that completes the horror-fantasy of the Middle East, a poster image dehumanizing an entire region to human-less figures in black burkas and moreover, this season, to refugees."

Alex Gansa, the creator of the show, commented, "We wish we’d caught these images before they made it to air. However, as Homeland always strives to be subversive in its own right and a stimulus for conversation, we can’t help but admire this act of artistic sabotage."

== Reception ==
=== Reviews ===
With 10 positive reviews out of 10, the episode received a rating of 100% with an average score of 9 out of 10 on the review aggregator Rotten Tomatoes, with the site's consensus stating "Built around a thrilling terrorism plot that forces the main characters into difficult moral choices, 'The Tradition of Hospitality' is Homeland at its best."

Ben Travers of IndieWire gave the episode an 'A−' grade, stating that "Homeland has set up a gripping premise for its new season, and I can't wait to see how it plays out". Joshua Alston of The A.V. Club also gave a grade of "A−", calling it a "thrilling episode" and praising how effective it was in bringing together various character threads.

The Atlantic included "The Tradition of Hospitality" on its list of the top television episodes of 2015.

=== Ratings ===
The original broadcast was watched by 1.40 million viewers, a decrease in viewership from the season premiere of 1.66 million viewers.

=== Accolades ===
For this episode, Lesli Linka Glatter was nominated for the Directors Guild of America Award for Outstanding Directing – Drama Series at the 68th Directors Guild of America Awards and for Outstanding Directing for a Drama Series at the 68th Primetime Emmy Awards.
