= The Litvinov Ruse =

- Homeland episode
- Episode no.: Season 5 Episode 9
- Directed by: Tucker Gates
- Story by: Howard Gordon; Patrick Harbinson
- Teleplay by: Alex Gansa
- Production code: 5WAH09
- Original air date: November 29, 2015
- Running time: 55 minutes

Guest appearances
- Nina Hoss as Astrid; Mark Ivanir as Ivan Krupin; René Ifrah as Bibi; Allan Corduner as Etai Luskin; Rachid Sabitri as Dr. Aziz

Episode chronology
← Previous "All About Allison"	Next → "New Normal"
- Homeland season 5

"The Litvinov Ruse" is the ninth episode of the fifth season of the American television drama series Homeland, and the 57th episode overall. It premiered on Showtime on November 29, 2015.

== Plot ==
Carrie Mathison (Claire Danes) explains to Saul (Mandy Patinkin) the connection she found between Allison Carr (Miranda Otto) and Ahmed Nazari. Needing hard evidence of her treason, they set up a plan with the intent of compelling Allison to reach out to her handler, in cooperation with the BND. First, Saul visits Allison at night, claiming that he's come to say goodbye, as he's been granted asylum by Israel. Saul spends the night, and while Allison sleeps, he installs a software bug in her cell phone and plants a microphone with GPS tracker in her purse.

The next day, BND officers Astrid (Nina Hoss) and Adler (Martin Wuttke) meet with Dar Adal (F. Murray Abraham) and Allison, reporting that a high-ranking SVR chief has defected, and that he has documents detailing how the CIA's Berlin station has been compromised. After the meeting, Allison uses her phone to send a coded alert and books a trip to Copenhagen. As Carrie, Saul and BND personnel monitor Allison via drone and GPS, they see that she does not take her scheduled trip but instead drives to a safehouse. When Astrid recognizes Krupin (Mark Ivanir) as the man greeting Allison there, Saul orders their immediate arrest. Krupin becomes enraged when he realizes Allison has been tricked, but Allison reassures him and says she has a plan. They surrender peacefully. In an interrogation room with Dar Adal, Allison defiantly states that Krupin was an asset of hers, not vice versa.

Dr. Aziz (Rachid Sabitri) tells Qasim (Alireza Bayram) that he has constructed a sealed chamber in which they can test the effectiveness of their sarin gas composition and that Quinn will be the test subject. He also shows Qasim a sarin antidote they can use to limit its effects if the chamber leaks. When Qasim brings food to Quinn (Rupert Friend), Quinn describes the horrific effects of sarin, and tries to convince Qasim to prevent the attack on innocent people in Berlin. As Quinn is taken to the chamber, Qasim signals to him to run. When he does, Qasim tackles him and covertly injects him with the antidote. Quinn is then brought into the chamber and the gas is turned on. Quinn begins frothing at the mouth and convulsing as the episode ends.

== Production ==
Tucker Gates directed the episode. The episode's story was conceived by executive producers Howard Gordon and Patrick Harbinson, and the teleplay was written by showrunner Alex Gansa.

== Reception ==
=== Reviews ===
The episode received a rating of 100% with an average score of 7.7 out of 10 on the review aggregator Rotten Tomatoes, with the site's consensus stating "'The Litvinov Ruse' is classic Homeland with a tight espionage plot and first-class acting at its core".

The A.V. Club's Joshua Alston gave the episode an "A−" grade, and wrote that Allison's final gambit was a "terrific twist that elevates the character and makes me really excited for the final three episodes". Cynthia Littleton of Variety praised Mandy Patinkin's performance, and also discussed Saul's bugging of Allison's purse as a standout scene, giving credit to the framing of the shots and the sound mixing contributing to "the crazy tension".

=== Ratings ===
The original broadcast was watched by 1.42 million viewers, a decrease in viewership from the previous week of 1.47 million viewers.
