= In Stereo (film) =

- Directed by: Mel Rodriguez III
- Written by: Mel Rodriguez III
- Produced by: Danny Roth; Damiano Tucci
- Starring: Beau Garrett; Micah Hauptman; Melissa Bolona; Aimee Mullins; Mario Cantone
- Cinematography: Bryan Koss
- Edited by: Mel Rodriguez III
- Production company: Parkside Pictures
- Distributed by: Circus Road Films
- Release date: July 3, 2015 (US)
- Running time: 97 min
- Country: United States
- Language: English

In Stereo is a 2015 American romantic comedy film directed and written by Mel Rodriguez III. The film stars Beau Garrett, Micah Hauptman, Melissa Bolona, Aimee Mullins, and Mario Cantone.

== Cast ==
- Beau Garrett as Brenda Schiffer
- Micah Hauptman as David Gallo
- Melissa Bolona as Jennifer
- Aimee Mullins as Trisha Bontecou
- Mario Cantone as John Resnick
- Maggie Geha as Paula

== Production ==
Mel Rodriguez III made his directorial debut with the film based on his own script, and produced by Danny Roth and Damiano Tucci.

== Release ==
In Stereo was released domestically on July 3, 2015, by Circus Road Films.
