= Dan Attias =

American television director and producer (born 1951)

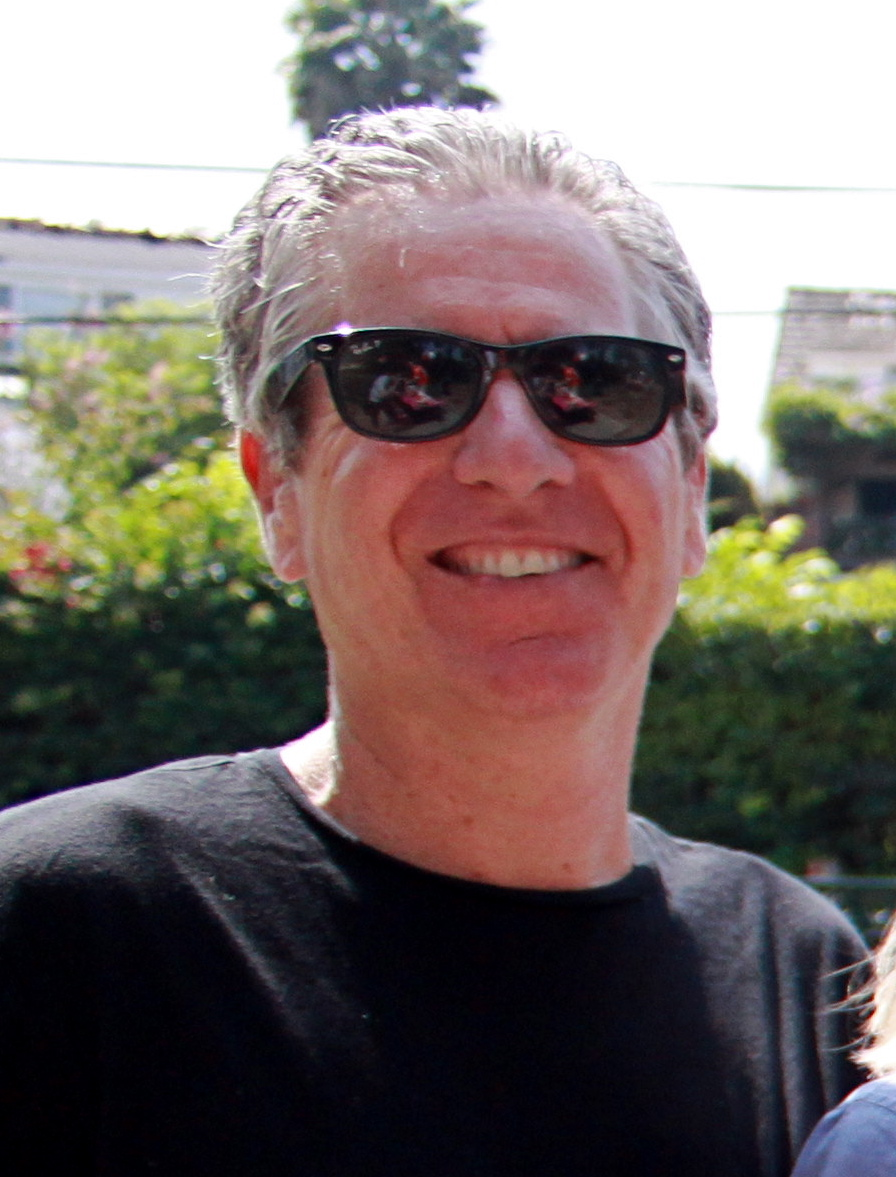
- Attias in 2011
- Born: December 4, 1951 (age 74); Los Angeles, California, U.S.
- Occupations: Television director, television producer
- Years active: 1978–present
- Spouse: Diana Attias
- Children: David Attias; Rachel Attias

Daniel Attias (born December 4, 1951) is an American television director and producer. He is also director of his only feature film Silver Bullet from 1985, based on the novella by Stephen King. Attias' career has spanned five decades, during which he has directed a significant number of popular primetime television programs, including Miami Vice and Beverly Hills, 90210. He frequently works on series for HBO and has directed episodes of The Sopranos, The Wire, Six Feet Under, True Blood, Entourage and Deadwood. Attias has received two Emmy Award nominations for his directing of Entourage.

He was a regular director for the espionage drama Alias. He has also directed two episodes of Lost and several episodes of Homeland and It's Always Sunny in Philadelphia.

== Isla Vista cases ==
In February 2001, his son David killed five people with his vehicle and was ruled legally insane and sentenced to 60 years in a mental institution. He was released in 2012 after serving 10 years. Several eyewitnesses said they heard his son shout "I am the Angel of Death" and other satanic phrases moments after the collision.

A civil case was brought against Dan and his wife Diana, for recklessly permitting their son David to drive their 1991 Saab 9000. That suit was settled confidentially in September 2003.

== Director credits ==
- Miami Vice (1984) TV Series
- Silver Bullet (1985) Film
- Sledge Hammer! (1986) TV Series
- 21 Jump Street (1987) TV Series
- Beauty and the Beast (1987) TV Series
- Jake and the Fatman (1987) TV Series
- The Young Riders (1989) TV Series
- Northern Exposure (1990) TV Series
  - episode "First Snow"
  - episode "Mi Casa, Su Casa"
  - episode "Revelations"
- Beverly Hills, 90210 (1990) TV Series (19 episodes 1990–1994)
- Melrose Place (1992) TV Series
- Picket Fences (1992) TV Series
- Dr. Quinn, Medicine Woman (1993) TV Series
  - episode "Sanctuary"
  - episode "What Is Love?"
- The Adventures of Brisco County, Jr. (1993) TV Series (one episode)
- Lois & Clark: The New Adventures of Superman (1993) TV Series
  - episode 3.03 "Contact"
- Party of Five (1994) TV Series (15 episodes, 1994–1999)
- The Client (1995) TV Series
- New York News (1995) TV Series
- Mr. & Mrs. Smith (1996) TV Series
  - episode "The Grape Escape"
- Early Edition (1996) TV Series
- The Practice (1997) TV Series
- Buffy the Vampire Slayer (1997) TV Series
  - episode 5.08 "Shadow"
  - episode 5.14 "Crush"
- Ally McBeal (1997) TV Series
- The Sopranos (1999) TV Series
  - episode 1.02 "46 Long"
  - episode 3.09 "The Telltale Moozadell"
  - episode 4.08 "Mergers and Acquisitions"
- Ally (1999) TV Series
- Time of Your Life (1999) TV Series
- Six Feet Under (2001)
  - 2.07 "Back to the Garden"
  - 3.08 "Tears, Bones and Desire"
  - 3.11 "Death Works Overtime"
  - 4.02 "In Case of Rapture"
  - 4.08 "Coming and Going"
  - 5.02 "Dancing for Me"
- Alias (2001) TV Series
  - episode 1.06 "Reckoning"
  - episode 1.20 "Solution, The"
  - episode 2.03 "Cipher"
  - episode 2.07 "Counteragent, The"
  - episode 3.02 "Succession"
  - episode 3.08 "Breaking Point"
  - episode 4.08 "Echoes"
- The Wire (2002) TV Series
  - episode 2.08 "Duck and Cover"
  - episode 3.05 "Straight and True"
  - episode 4.06 "Margin of Error"
  - episode 5.04 "Transitions"
- CSI: Miami (2002) TV Series
  - episode 1.10 "Kill Zone"
- American Dreams (2002) TV Series
- The O.C. (2003) TV Series
  - episode 1.04 "Debut, The"
- Line of Fire (2003) TV Series
  - episode 1.07 "I'm Your Boogie Man"
- Entourage (2004) TV Series
  - episode 1.04 "Date Night"
  - episode 2.05 "Neighbors"
  - episode 2.08 "Oh, Mandy"
  - episode 2.11 "Blue Balls Lagoon"
  - episode 2.12 "Good Morning, Saigon"
  - episode 3.16 "Gotcha!"
  - episode 3.17 "Return of the King"
  - episode 4.11 "No Cannes Do" (nominated for a Primetime Emmy Award for Outstanding Directing in a Comedy Series)
- Lost (2004) TV Series
  - episode 1.18 "Numbers"
  - episode 6.12 "Everybody Loves Hugo"
- Boston Legal (2004) TV Series
  - episode 1.03 "Catch and Release"
- Huff (2004) TV Series
  - episode 1.04
- House (2004) TV Series
  - episode 1.10 "Histories"
  - episode 2.01 "Acceptance"
  - episode 2.03 "Humpty Dumpty"
  - episode 2.12 "Distractions"
  - episode 8.02 "Transplant"
- Deadwood (2004) TV Series
  - episode 3.02 "I Am Not the Fine Man You Take Me For"
- It's Always Sunny in Philadelphia (2005) TV Series
  - 1.03 "Underage Drinking: A National Concern"
  - 1.05 "Gun Fever"
  - 1.06 "The Gang Finds a Dead Guy"
  - 2.02 "The Gang Goes Jihad"
  - 2.03 "Dennis and Dee Go on Welfare"
  - 2.04 "Mac Bangs Dennis' Mom"
  - 2.05 "Hundred Dollar Baby"
  - 2.06 "The Gang Gives Back"
  - 2.07 "The Gang Exploits a Miracle"
  - 2.08 "The Gang Runs for Office"
  - 2.09 "Charlie Goes America All Over Everybody's Ass"
  - 2.10 "Dennis and Dee Get a New Dad"
  - 9.04 "Mac and Dennis Buy a Timeshare"
  - 9.06 "The Gang Saves the Day"
  - 9.08 "Flowers for Charlie"
  - 9.09 "The Gang Makes Lethal Weapon 6"
- Commander in Chief (2005) TV Series
  - episode 1.07 "First Scandal"
- Big Love (2006) TV Series
  - episode 2.08 "Kingdom Come"
  - episode 3.01 "Block Party"
- Damages (2007) TV Series
  - episode 1.07 "We Are Not Animals"
- Heroes (2007) TV Series
  - episode 2.07 "Out of Time"
- Friday Night Lights (2008) TV Series
  - episode 2.11 "Jumping the Gun"
- Treme (2010) TV Series
  - episode 1.09 "Wish Someone Would Care"
- Homeland (2011) TV Series
  - episode 1.03 "Clean Skin"
  - episode 2.09 "Two Hats"
  - episode 4.10 "13 Hours in Islamabad"
  - episode 5.08 "All About Allison"
  - episode 5.09 "New Normal"
  - episode 6.09 "Sock Puppets"
  - episode 7.10 "Clarity"
  - episode 8.09 "In Full Flight"
- True Blood (2008) TV Series
  - episode 5.06 "Hopeless"
  - episode 5.09 "Everybody Wants to Rule the World"
  - episode 6.02 "The Sun"
- The Killing (2011) TV Series
  - episode 1.08 "Stonewalled"
  - episode 2.02 "My Lucky Day"
- The Walking Dead (2012) TV Series
  - episode 3.06 "Hounded"
- The Americans (2013) TV Series
  - episode 2.05 "The Deal"
  - episode 6.03 "Urban Transport Planning"
- Resurrection (2014) TV Series
  - episode 1.02 "Unearth"
  - episode 1.07 "Schemes of the Devil"
  - episode 1.08 "Torn Apart"
  - episode 2.13 "Loved in Return"
- Get Shorty (2017) TV Series
  - episode 1.07 "Grace Under Pressure"
  - episode 1.08 "Shot on Location"
- Snowfall (2017) TV Series
  - episode 1.03 "Slow Hand"
  - episode 2.01 "Sightlines"
  - episode 3.01 "Protect and Swerve"
- Seven Seconds (2018) TV Series
  - episode 1.08 "Bailed Out"
- The Boys (2019) TV Series
  - episode 1.07 "The Self-Preservation Society"
- The Marvelous Mrs. Maisel (2019) TV Series
  - episode 3.02 "It's the Sixties, Man!"
- Penny Dreadful: City of Angels (2020) (TV series)
  - episode 1.09 "Sing, Sing, Sing"
- Barkskins (2020) (TV series)
  - episode 1.06 "The Wobble"
- Billions (2021) TV series
  - episode 5.11 "Victory Smoke"
  - episode 5.12 "No Direction Home"
  - episode 6.01 "Hindenburg"
- The Consultant (2023) TV series
  - episode 1.02 "Mama"
  - episode 1.03 "Friday"
- Lucky Hank (2023) TV series
  - episode 1.03 "Escape"
  - episode 1.04 "The Goose Boxer"
- Rabbit Hole (2023) TV series
  - episode 1.05 "Tom"
