= Mousa Kraish =

American actor

Mousa Hussein Kraish
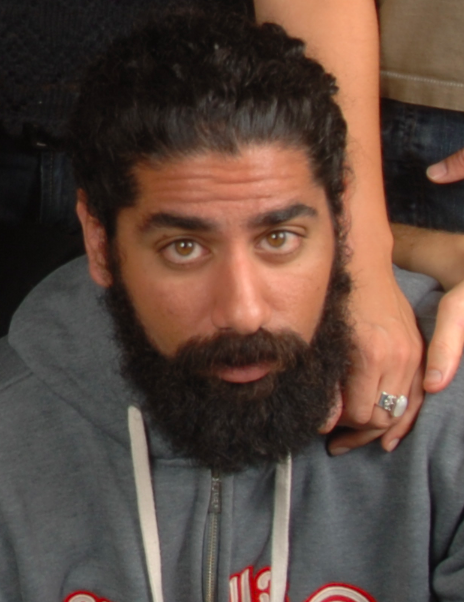
- Mousa Hussein Kraish
- Born: November 21
- Occupations: Actor, director
- Years active: 2000s-present

Mousa Hussein Kraish (/ˈmuːsə ˈkreɪʃ/ MOO-sə KRAYSH; Arabic: موسى حسين قريش; born November 21) is an American actor and director, who has appeared in several Hollywood films including Steven Spielberg's 2005 film Munich. He is best known for his role as the Jinn in American Gods.

== Biography ==
Kraish was born and raised in a Palestinian family in the Bay Ridge section of Brooklyn, New York. He is the oldest of nine children. Kraish attended Islamic school on Saturdays in Brooklyn until he was kicked out for his pranks. He first studied to become a doctor, then switched to working for an internet company. After graduating from Brooklyn College he spent two and a half years studying theater at David Mamet's Atlantic Theater Company. In addition to appearing in numerous independent and Hollywood films in recent years, Kraish also performed on stage at the 2004 New York Fringe Festival and the 2005 Arab-American Comedy Festival. He currently resides in Los Angeles, California.

== Filmography ==
=== Film ===
Year	Title	Role
2005	Man Push Cart	Guy in Karaoke
2005	Munich	Badran - Mohammed Safady
2007	Finishing the Game	Raja
2007	King of California	Bruce
2007	Superbad	Billy Baybridge
2008	Option 3	Bison
2008	You Don't Mess With The Zohan	Bashir
2008	Fling	Patrick
2008	The Day the Earth Stood Still	Yusef
2009	Fast & Furious	Silvia Driver
2009	Land of the Lost	Barry (uncredited)
2009	The Junior League of Superheroes	Teacher's Assistant
2011	Treatment	Night Clerk
2012	Sunset Stories	Tom
2012	Super Zeroes	Jimmy
2012	Overnight	Mohammed
2012	The Dictator	Wadiyan Soldier
2012	Dust Up	Farmer
2014	Echo Park	Theo
2019	The Day Shall Come	Malik
2023	Yes Repeat No	Arab Juliano
2023	Your Lucky Day	Amir
2025	Atropia	Ray

=== Television ===
Year	Title	Role	Notes
2010	Blue Bloods	Kalid Hassan	Episode: What You See
2011	Chuck	Damian	Episode: "Chuck Versus the Muuurder"
2015	Homeland	Behruz	Episode: "The Tradition of Hospitality"
2017	American Gods	The Jinn	5 episodes
2022	Super Pumped	Fawzi Kamel	6 episodes
2023	History of the World: Part II	Palestinian Ambassador	1 episode
2023	FBI	Mustafa Samir	Episode: Sins of the Past
2023	Star Trek: Picard	USS Titan cook	1 episode
2026	The Boroughs	Dr. McGinnis	3 episodes

=== as Writer/Director ===
- How To Make A Dollar Bill in Brooklyn
- A Brother's Love
- The Fourth Estate
