= Judith Warner =

American writer (born 1965)

Judith Warner (born July 4, 1965) is an American writer.

Warner is a senior fellow at American Progress, a contributing writer for The New York Times Magazine and a columnist for Time.com as well as the author of a range of nonfiction books, among them You Have the Power: How to Take Back Our Country and Restore Democracy in America (with Howard Dean) and the bestselling biography Hillary Clinton: The Inside Story. A former special correspondent for Newsweek in Paris, she has reviewed books for The Washington Post and has written about politics and women’s issues for magazines including The New Republic and ELLE. She also wrote (until December 18, 2009) The New York Times blog Domestic Disturbances. She is Jewish. She lives in Washington, D.C., with her husband, Bloomberg editor Max Berley, and their children.

Until 2007, she hosted a weekend show on XM Radio on the Take Five channel.

== Selected bibliography ==
- You Have the Power: How to Take Back Our Country and Restore Democracy in America (with Howard Dean)
- Hillary Clinton: The Inside Story. (1999) ISBN 978-0451198952
- Perfect Madness: Motherhood in the Age of Anxiety (Riverhead, 2005)
- We've Got Issues: Children and Parents in the Age of Medication
- And Then They Stopped Talking to Me: Making Sense of Middle School (Crown, 2020)
