= Micah Hauptman =

American actor

- Born: Micah A. Hauptman; December 26, 1973 (age 52); Philadelphia, Pennsylvania, U.S.
- Occupation: Actor
- Years active: 2001–present
- Notable work: Parker; Everest

Micah A. Hauptman (born December 26, 1973) is an American film and television actor, known for playing the lead role of David Gallo in the film In Stereo, August Hardwicke in the film Parker, and real-life character David Breashears in Everest.

== Career ==
In 2013, Hauptman played August Hardwicke, a gang-member in the action-thriller Parker along with Jason Statham and Jennifer Lopez.

In 2015, Hauptman appeared as guest in the fifth season of the Showtime's drama series Homeland, he played the role of Mills, a CIA tech. He played the lead role as David Gallo in the romantic comedy film In Stereo along with Beau Garrett. Mel Rodriguez III directed the film, which released on July 3, 2015 by Circus Road Films.

Hauptman played the real-life documentary filmmaker and mountaineer David Breashears in the disaster adventure-thriller film Everest, along with Jason Clarke, Josh Brolin, and Jake Gyllenhaal. Baltasar Kormákur directed the film, which was released on September 18, 2015 by Universal Pictures.

== Filmography ==
=== Film ===
Year	Title	Role	Notes
2001	Spirit Rising		Short film
2003	Got Papers?	Man In Black	
2003	P.O.V.: The Camera's Eye	Derek	
2004	The Noise		Short film
2004	What Are the Odds	Charlie	Short film
2007	Finishing the Game	Agent #2	
2008	Iron Man	Lacy	
2010	The Mushroom Sessions	David	Short film
2011	S.W.A.T.: Firefight	Richard Mundy	TV film
2011	A Bag of Hammers	Vince Ortega	
2012	iVOTE	Steve Parks	Short film
2013	Parker	August Hardwicke	
2013	I Am I		
2014	Bread and Butter	Leonard Marsh	
2015	In Stereo	David Gallo	
2015	Intimate Strangers	Donny Doverman	Short film
2015	Silver Skies	Kevin	
2015	The Lennon Report	Bob Goodrich	
2015	Burned	Daniel	Short film
2015	Everest	David Breashears	
2015	The Pastor	Captain Raphe	Completed
2015	Listen	Kevin Moore	Post-production
2016	Control: A Love Story	Conrad	Post-production
2018	We the Coyotes	Greg	
2018	Rust Creek	Hollister	
2020	The Boy Behind the Door	The Creep	
2020	Phobias	Dirk	

=== Television ===
Year	Title	Role	Notes
2010	Lie to Me	Frazier	1 episode
2011	Supernatural	Eric Kripke	1 episode
2011	The Glades	Kevin Fowler	1 episode
2013	Masters of Sex	Kyle	1 episode
2013	White Collar	Karl Dekker	1 episode
2014	The Lottery	Jason	1 episode
2015	Homeland	Mills	3 episodes
2021	Nova Vita	Carter Hayes	10 episodes
