= Sarah Sokolovic =

American actress

- Other name: Sascha
- Occupation: Actress
- Years active: 2011–present
- Notable work: Homeland, Big Little Lies

Sarah Sokolovic is an American film, television, and theatre actress, who starred in Homeland as Laura Sutton and has a recurring role on Big Little Lies. She has also performed on stage, including in The Shaggs: Philosophy of the World, Detroit, and A Streetcar Named Desire.

== Early life and education ==
Sarah Sokolovic's is the daughter of Dimso "Dan" Sokolovic, of Serbian descent, who immigrated to the United States from Germany, and Donna Stowell, an American woman of German and English descent.

Sokolovic graduated in 2011 from the Yale School of Drama.

== Career ==
=== Theater work ===
Sokolovic started her career on stage. She performed the role of Betty in the musical The Shaggs: Philosophy of the World at Playwrights Horizons in New York City, for which she was nominated for the Drama Desk Award for Outstanding Featured Actress in a Musical. Later she performed in the play Detroit at Playwrights Horizons along with Amy Ryan, David Schwimmer, John Cullum, and Darren Pettie.

In 2013, she performed in the A Streetcar Named Desire at the Yale Repertory Theatre along with Adam O'Byrne.

=== Film and television ===
In 2013, Sokolovic played Gwen, a prostitute, in the crime thriller Cold Comes the Night, directed by Tze Chun and starring Alice Eve and Bryan Cranston. It was released domestically on January 10, 2014.

In 2014, Sokolovic played Maveen Lyttle in the crime film Every Secret Thing along with Diane Lane, Elizabeth Banks, and Dakota Fanning, directed by Amy J. Berg, and released on May 15, 2015.

In June 2015, Sokolovic was cast in season 5 of Homeland as Laura Sutton, an American journalist in Berlin who works for the Düring Foundation.

Since 2017, she has played the role of Tori Bachman on the award-winning TV show Big Little Lies.

Sokolovic acted on the TV series The Good Wife, Timeless, and Unforgettable.

== Filmography ==
=== Film ===
Year	Title	Role	Notes
2013	Cold Comes the Night	Gwen	
2013	La vida inesperada (The Unexpected Life)	Holly	
2014	Every Secret Thing	Maveen Lyttle	
2015	The Iron Warehouse	Christina Harper	Short
2018	Dinner Party	Betty	Short
2018	7 Splinters in Time	Chess girl	

=== Television ===
Year	Title	Role	Notes
2011	Unforgettable	Lauren Garber	Episode: "Check Out Time"
2012	The Good Wife	Mary Jane Heidel	Episode: "Pants on Fire"
2015	Homeland	Laura Sutton	12 episodes
2017, 2019	Big Little Lies	Tori Bachman	Recurring role, 7 episodes
2018	Timeless	Grace Humiston	Episode: "Mrs. Sherlock Holmes"
2018	Code Black	Abigail Martin	Episode: "Better Angels"
2018	MacGyver	Amber	Episode: "Murdoc + MacGyver + Murdoc"

== Awards and nominations ==
Year	Award	Category	Nominated work	Result
2016	22nd Screen Actors Guild Awards	Outstanding Performance by an Ensemble in a Drama Series (shared with the ensemble)	Homeland	Nominated
