= René Ifrah =

American actor

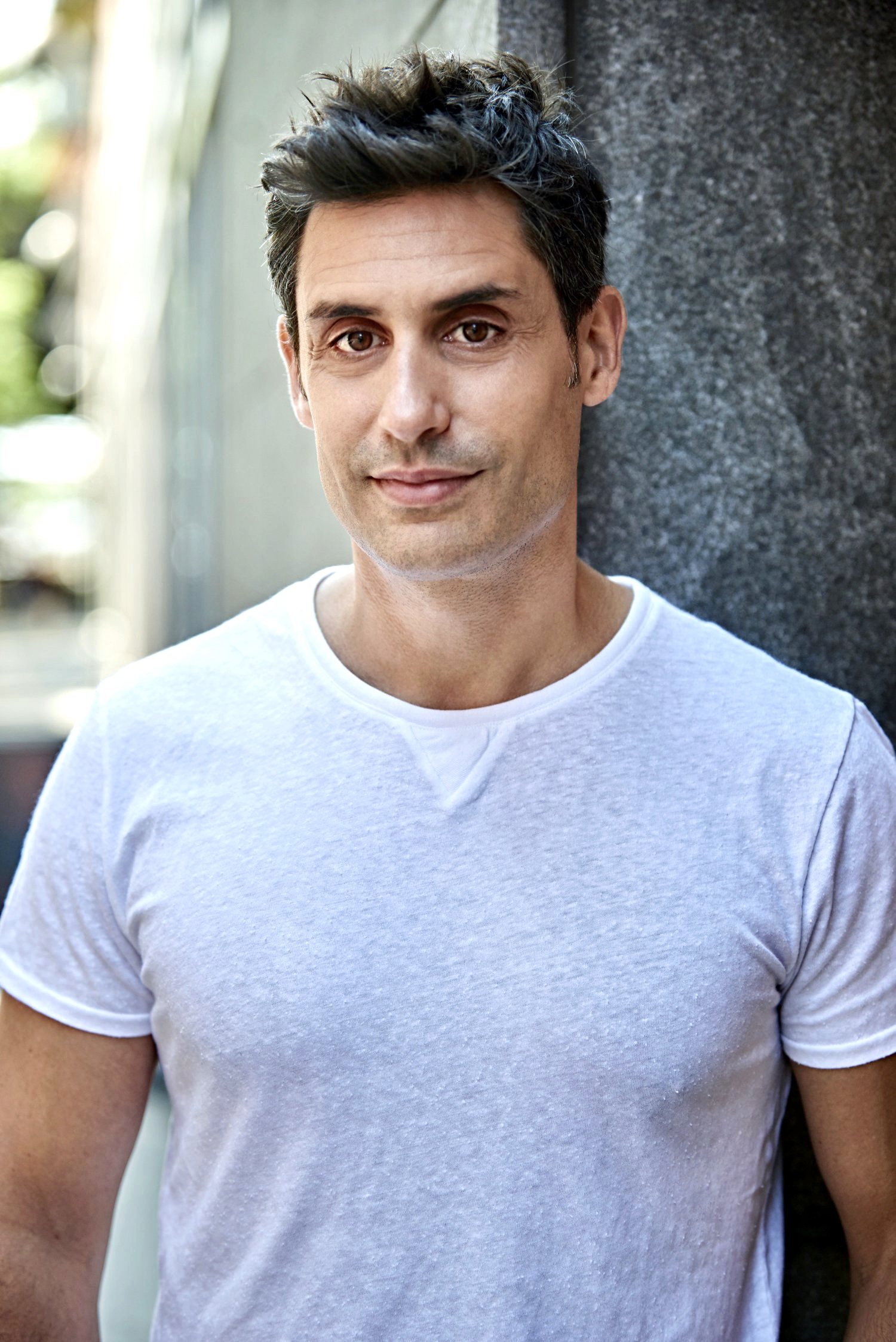
- René Ifrah
- Born: Frankfurt, Germany
- Occupation: Actor
- Years active: 1996–present
- Website: www.reneifrah.com

René Ifrah is an American actor born in Germany and raised in Brooklyn, New York City. He is best known for his role as Bibi Hamed on the Showtime series Homeland, for which he was nominated for a Screen Actors Guild Award (2016). He is also known for his recurring roles on Showtime's crime drama Sneaky Pete, where he played the character of Wali (2017–2018); the Showtime Drama series The Affair (2017); and the Showtime comedy series Nurse Jackie (2009–2011).

== Early life ==
Rene Ifrah was born in Frankfurt, Germany, and raised there and in Sicily until moving to Brooklyn, New York, with his family around the age of 10. He is of German, Sephardic, and Italian descent.

== Career ==
=== Film ===
After his film debut in a small part in the 2002 film Hart's War, starring Bruce Willis and Colin Farrell, Ifrah went on to co-star in the German ensemble film September as Ashraf, a Pakistani pizzeria owner in Hamburg, Germany, at odds with his German wife after the September 11 attacks. He then starred in the German film Grüße aus Kaschmir (2004), for which he won a Grimme-Preis (2005) for best ensemble. He then appeared in Beyond the Sea as well as The Taking of Pelham 123.

=== Television ===
After guest starring roles on shows including NBC's Law & Order and Law & Order: Special Victims Unit, and American Broadcasting Company's Life on Mars, Ifrah landed a recurring role in the Showtime comedy series Nurse Jackie.

He had a recurring role as Danny in the Starz miniseries Flesh and Bone before landing the part of Bibi Hamed for season five of the Showtime program Homeland.

Since Homeland, Ifrah has had further recurring parts on Showtime's The Affair and Sneaky Pete as well as additional guest appearances on Netflix's The Punisher and CBS's Blue Bloods and God Friended Me.

== Filmography ==
=== Film ===
Year	Title	Role	Notes
2000	Berlintaxi	Yussuf	Short film
2002	Hart's War	Pvt. T.S. Krasner	
2003	September	Ashraf	
2004	Beyond the Sea	2nd Assistant Director	
2005	Warum Ulli sich am Weihnachtsabend umbringen wollte	Heino	
2006	Fay Grim	Cameo	
2007	I'd Like to Die a Thousand Times	Cameo	
2009	Dry River Road	Akeem Maleki	Short film
2009	The Taking of Pelham 123	Cameo	
2018	Nancy	Jake Lee	

=== Television (selected roles) ===
Year	Title	Role	Notes
2004	Altair in Starland	Grizzl (voice)	Main cast, nine episodes
2004	Blood of the Templars	Shareef	TV movie
2005	Was Sie schon immer über Singles wissen wollten	KC	TV movie
2005	Der letzte Zeuge	Madan Sansawar	Episode: "Das Rad des Lebens"
2006	Zores	Leo Rosen	TV movie
2006	Kommissarin Lucas	Mehmet	Two episodes: "Skizze einer Toten", "Die blaue Blume"
2007	Law & Order: Criminal Intent	George Lombardi	Episode: "Amends"
2007	Email to Bill Gates	Mr. Brill	TV movie
2008	Die Sache mit dem Glück	Manolo	TV movie
2008	Die Patin – Kein Weg zurück	Sandro	TV miniseries: (as Rene David Ifrah)
2009	Damages	Uniform Cop #2	Episode: "Hey! Mr. Pibb!"
2009	Life on Mars	The Groom	Episode: "Home Is Where You Hang Your Holster"
2007–2009	Law & Order	Alex Chambers & Sid Maxwell	Two episodes: "Human Flesh Search Engine", "Fallout"
2010	SOKO München	Antonio Mori	Episode: "Vendetta"
2010	The Sleeper's Wife	Zaid Ben Yakin	TV movie
2009–2011	Nurse Jackie	Officer Ryan	Recurring, five episodes
2012	Das Geheimnis der Villa Sabrini	Francesco Sabrini	TV movie
2013	Law & Order: Special Victims Unit	Officer Bracken	Episode: "Presumed Guilty"
2013	Die Pastorin	Dr. Antonio Alvarez	TV movie
2014	Believe	Stimson	Episode: "Together"
2014	Katie Fforde: Eine Liebe in New York	Alejandro	TV movie
2015	Franziskas Welt: Hochzeiten und andere Hürden	Dr. Antonio Alvarez	TV movie
2015	Flesh and Bone	Danny	TV miniseries: three episodes
2015	Homeland	Bibi Hamed	Recurring, season 5, seven episodes
2014	Katie Fforde: Das Schweigen der Männer	Howard Harper	TV movie
2016	Shakespeares letzte Runde	Petruchio	TV movie
2014	Sneaky Pete	Wali	Recurring, five episodes
2016–2017	The Affair	Detective Romero	Recurring, three episodes
2017	The Punisher	Officer Jack	Episode: "Danger Close"
2018	Get Christie Love	Mamoun	TV movie
2018	Blue Bloods	Tariq Ali	Episode: "Close Calls"

=== Voiceover work ===
Year	Title	Role	Notes	Ref.
2004	Altair in Starland	Voices of Altair and Grizzl	9 episodes	

== Awards and nominations ==
Year	Association	Category	Nominated work	Result	Ref.
2005	Adolf Grimme Award	Best Ensemble Cast Award (shared with the cast)	Grüße aus Kaschmir	Won	
2016	Screen Actors Guild Awards	Best Ensemble Cast Award (shared with the cast)	Homeland: Season 5	Nominated	
