= Kraszewski =

Kraszewski (feminine: Kraszewska) is a Polish toponymic surname tthan can be derived from places with names Kraszew, Kraszewice, Kraszewo. The coat of arms is Jastrzębiec.

== People ==
- Antoni Kraszewski (1797–1870), Polish politician
- Charles S. Kraszewski (born 1962), American translator
- Józef Ignacy Kraszewski (1812–1887), Polish writer
- Julia Kraszewska (1908–1993), Polish actress and singer
- Kajetan Kraszewski (1827–1896), Polish writer
- Kristina Kraszewski (born 1979), American tennis player
- Lucjan Kraszewski (1820–1892), Polish artist and photographer
- Otolia Kraszewska (1859–1945), Polish painter

== Fictional ==
- Waldemar Kraszewski, character on Ultraviolet
