= An Ancient Tale =

An Ancient Tale may refer to:

- An Ancient Tale: When the Sun Was a God, a 2003 Polish film
- An Ancient Tale (novel), an 1876 novel by Polish writer Józef Ignacy Kraszewski
