= Kajetan Kraszewski =

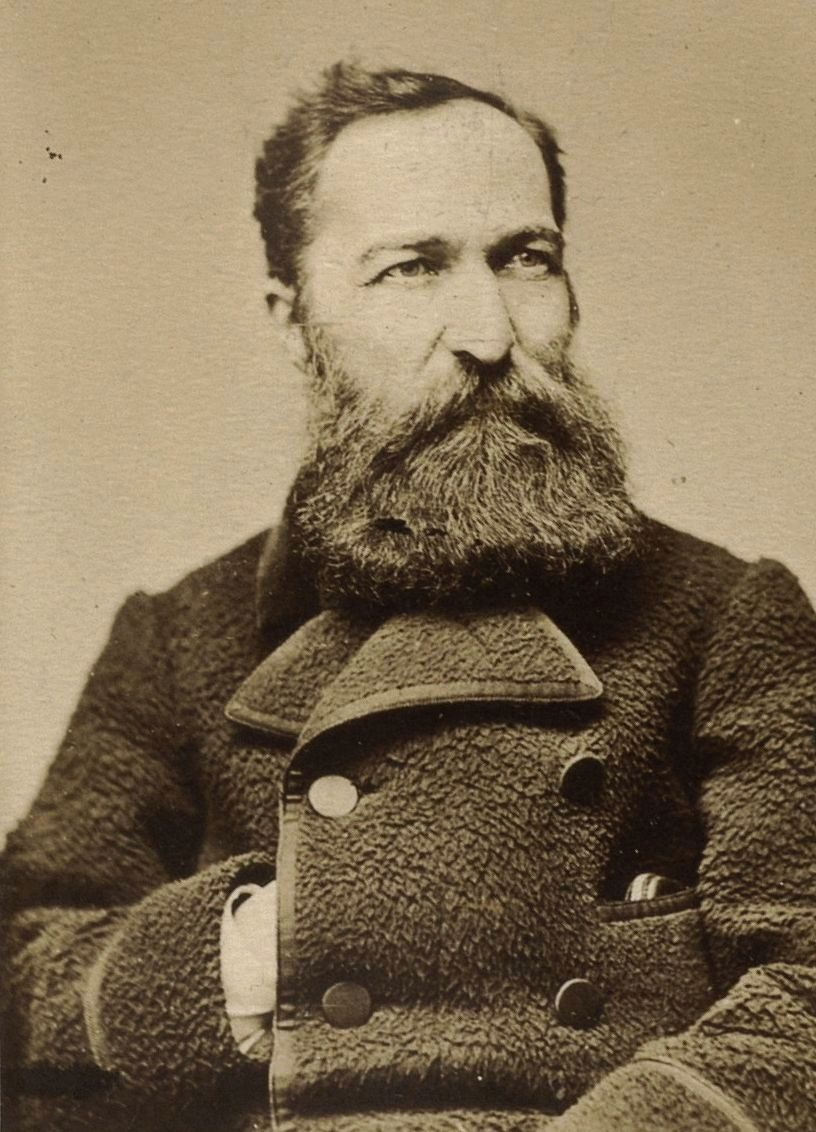
Kajetan Kraszewski, ca.1880

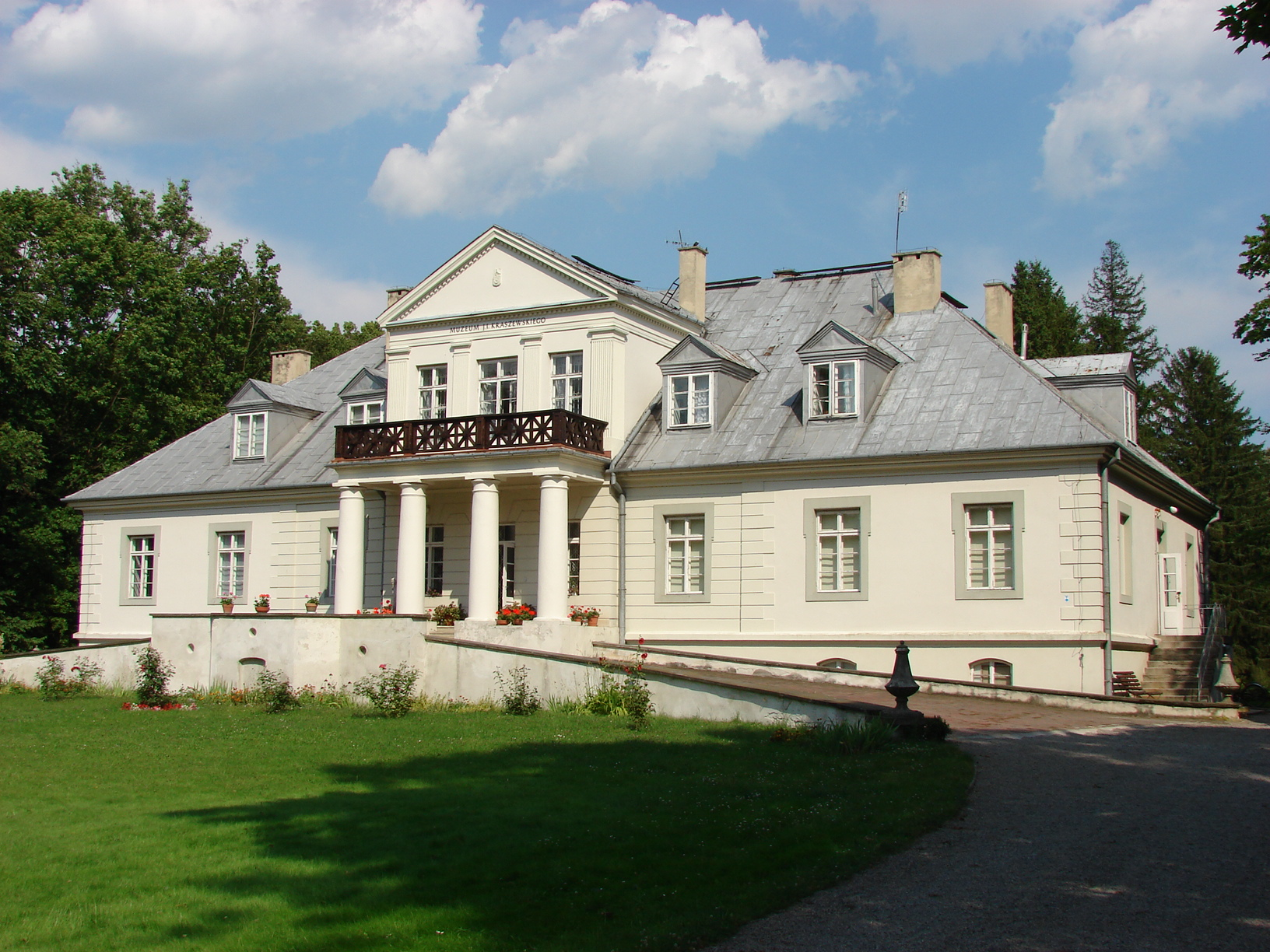
Kraszewski Museum in Romanów

Kajetan Kraszewski (Pruzhany district, 11 March 1827 - 1 July 1896, Pruzhany district) was a younger brother of Józef Ignacy Kraszewski and Lucjan Kraszewski. He wrote many novels and plays, as well as the history of the Kraszewski family.

== Life ==
He was from a noble family, bearing the Jastrzębiec coat of arms; he was born to Jan Kraszewski, a major landowner, and his wife, Zofia Kraszewska, née Malska. In addition to Józef, he had another older brother, Lucjan, who was an artist and photographer. His primary education took place at the gymnasium in Svislach.

In 1854, he married Maria Rulikowska. Upon his father's death, in 1864, he inherited the family's estate in Romanów; reconstructing the manor house, which had been heavily damaged by a fire. He also created an astronomical observatory, with equipment imported from Munich, Berlin, Vienna and Paris, introduced modern farming methods, and built a greenhouse where he grew pineapples. He and Maria had five children; two of whom were deaf mutes. He died at home, and was interred at the family chapel in Dołhe.

He left a library of over 10,000 volumes, as well as collections of old prints and manuscripts, historical portraits, and various objects, including weapons. His son, Krzysztof, donated the books to the Jagiellonian Library in Kraków. Most of the other items were destroyed during World War II.

He wrote historical novels, plays, poetry, sketches, and memoirs. All but a few of his works are set in what is now Belarus. He also published detailed records of the Kraszewski family and their estates. He was an amateur composer as well; creating music for the piano based on local folk motifs.

== Most notable works ==
- Ze wspomnien kasztelanica (From the Castellan's Memoirs), 1896 (Online)
- Monografia domu Kraszewskich vel Kraszowskich Jastrzebczyków (Monograph of the house of Kraszewski), 1862 (Online)
