= Slavic fantasy =

Sub-genre of contemporary art

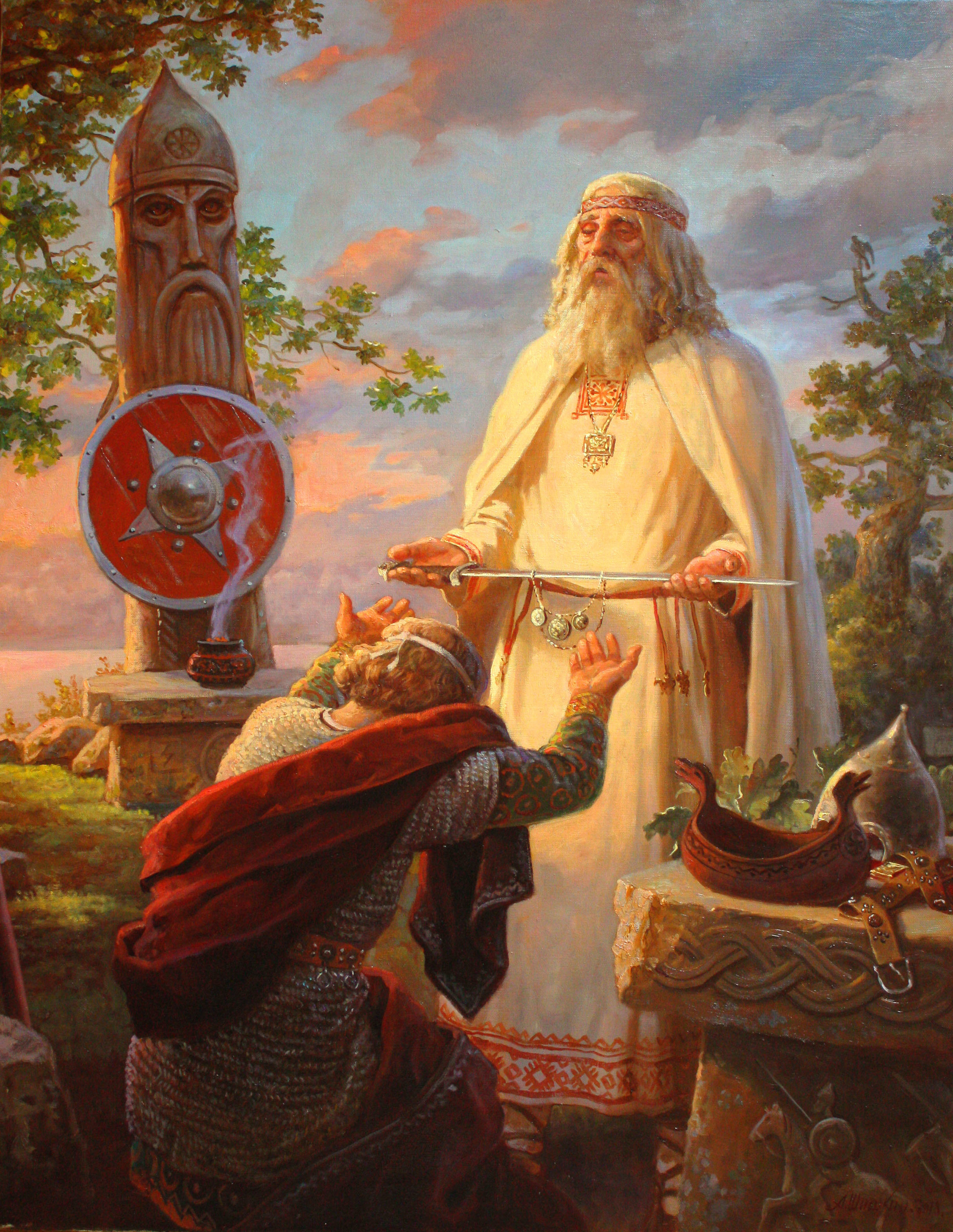
"Warrior's blessing" by Andrey Shishkin

Slavic fantasy (Russian: Славянское фэнтези, Polish: fantasy słowiańska) is a sub-genre of contemporary art (fantasy literature, cinema, video games, visual arts) that developed in the late 1990s and early 2000s. Slavic fantasy is distinguished by the incorporation of Slavic folklore, legends, bylinas, and myths into the general canons of fantasy literature. However, its genre boundaries remain indistinct.

A kind of fantasy genre in modern Russian mass literature, which has a certain specificity is fairy tale-mythological and adventure prose. Occasionally the term "Russian fantasy" is used as a synonym for Slavic fantasy, although the former phrase is more often used to refer to any fantasy written in Russian.

The Slavic fantasy also exists outside Russia. A major example of that genre outside Russia is the Polish fantasy series The Witcher.

== History ==
=== Precursors ===
Slavic fantasy as a distinct literary genre grew in opposition to Western fantasy, which has its origins in Celtic and Norse mythology. However, the literary tradition in which Slavic fantasy finds its modern roots emerged over a century ago. Sometimes the Russian folktales and medieval tales of Bovo Korolevich and Yeruslan Lazarevich are cited as the origins of Slavic fantasy, although those were originally adapted translations of Chivalric romances and the Iranian epic Shahnameh, respectively. The fantastic works of 18th-century writers Mikhail Popov, Mikhail Chulkov, and Vasily Lyovshin about Russian Bogatyrs are filled with the distinct realities of Slavic mythology and Russian history, but as these authors are reinterpreting Western court literature, they are not entirely original. Nevertheless, these books are considered predecessors to Pushkin's poem "Ruslan and Lyudmila."

Within Polish literature, Józef Ignacy Kraszewski's An Ancient Tale (1876) and Władysław Orkan's Drzewiej (1921) are seen as important precursor works for the Slavic fantasy genre.

Gogol's works such as Evenings on a Farm near Dikanka are often referred to as precursors to Slavic fantasy. Although largely forgotten today, the works of 19th century writer Alexander Veltman fit into the framework of Slavic fantasy, particularly his novels The Immortal Koschey (1833) and Svyatoslavovich, Nursling of the Devil (1834).

=== Contemporary Slavic fantasy ===
Yuri Nikitin founded modern Slavic fantasy (or at least its heroic sub-genre) with his series of novels The Three from the Forest. Another prominent author of Slavic fantasy is Maria Semyonova, who wrote the Wolfhound series. Some Russian-speaking writers draw on Norse mythology (classified by Dr. Elena Safron as Western fantasy) – Elizaveta Dvoretskaya's series Ship in the Fjord, for instance – and some English-speaking writers use Old Russian pagan folklore (e.g. Carolyn Cherryh in Rusalka (1989) and Chernevog (1990). Slavic fantasy motifs also play a very important role in Anton Vilgotsky's novel Shepherd of the Dead.

One of the most famous writers in Slavic fantasy is Andrzej Sapkowski, author of the Witcher series, which is the basis for the popular video game trilogy. Other examples of Polish works classified as Slavic fantasy include the Kajko i Kokosz comic book series.

== Classification ==
To classify Slavic fantasy, Elena Safron uses a general fantasy classification system based on Mosis Kagan's The Morphology of Art: Historical and Theoretical Study of the Inner Structure of the Art World. She proposes a number of identifiers of Slavic fantasy, including: the plot-thematic principle (epic and romantic fantasy), the time within the art (historical fantasy), the axiological principle (heroic and comedic fantasy), and mixed Slavic fantasy, which includes outside genre elements. Evgeny Gartsevich specifies two subgroups within Slavic fantasy: historical and heroic fantasy. Sergei and Zhanna Zhuravlev classify Slavic fantasy into three trends: historical, heroic, and comedic.

=== Plot-thematic principle ===
==== Epic fantasy ====
Examples are Yuri Nikitin's series The Three (which, however, has hallmarks of other varieties of Slavic fantasy and has many comic elements), and Sergei Fomichev's Meshchersky Magi series, which includes the novels The Gray Horde, The Prophecy of Predslava and Dream of the Hawk.

==== Romantic fantasy ====
In Elizaveta Dvoretskaya's series Princes of the Forest, the primary themes are divine and earthly love.

=== Time within the art ===
==== Historical fantasy ====
Historical fantasy is a variation of Slavic fantasy characterized by elements of historical novels. It originates from Maria Semyonova's novel Wolfhound, which features a number of historical elements, such as descriptions of everyday life, customs, and setting. The novel generated a series of five books: Wolfhound, Wolfound: The Right for a Fight, Stone of Rage, Wolfhound: Sign of the Way, and Emerald Mountains. Semyonova's success led to a number of followers who created the World of the Wolfhound series. Pavel Molytvin wrote the compendium Companions of the Wolfhound and the novels Winds of Fortune, Eurich's Path, and Shadow of the Emperor; Andrey Martyanov wrote The Time of Trouble, The Last War, and Age of Disasters; Alexey Semyonov wrote Isle of May and Wormwood Leaves; and Elena Khaetskaya wrote Road of the Steppe. Elizaveta Dvoretskaya combines the historical novel and Slavic fantasy in her work – for example, the cycle Princes of the Forest, consisting of three novels The Fiery Wolf (1997), The Morning Horseman (2002) and Unknown Spring (2002). Historical Slavic fantasy includes Olga Grigorieva's novels The Sorcerer, Berserk and Ladoga, as well as Rogue Bear by Sergei Shvedov.

=== Axiological principle ===
==== Heroic fantasy ====
This type of Slavic fantasy is characterized by a large number of battle scenes and fast paced plots. It originates from Yuri Nikitin's three cycles, The Hyperborea Cycle, The Three from the Forest, and The Prince's Feast. The Hyperborea Cycle consists of three novels: Ingvar and Olha, Prince Vladimir, and Prince Rus. Three of the Forest contains fifteen books with three main characters, Mrak, Oleg, and Targitay. The Princely Feast, in which the main characters are epic heroes, deals with patriotic themes: the return to Slavic roots, the greatness and glory of Kievan Rus', and the fight against foreign invaders. The series The Chronicles of Vladigora by Leond Butyakov also fits into the subgenre of Slavic-heroic fantasy.

==== Comedic fantasy ====
This sub-genre of Slavic fantasy includes Mikhail Uspensky's series about Zhikhar, The Charter of Falconry, Andrei Belyanin's The Secret Investigation of Tsar Gorokh, and Olga Gromyko's story Put in a Word for Poor Koshoe.

=== Mixed Slavic fantasy ===
Mixed Slavic fantasy works combine features of Slavic fantasy and other fantasy genres. Yuli Burkin and Sergei Lukyanenko's 1993 novel Island Rus, for instance, blurs the line between Slavic fantasy and science fiction.

== See also ==
- Russian science fiction and fantasy
- Folklore of Russia
- Slavic mythology
- Supernatural beings in Slavic religion
- Films based on Slavic mythology

== Literature ==
- Научный журнал КубГАУ, № 73(09), 2011 года. Становление жанра «славянской» фэнтези в русской литературе 18 века
