= Yuri Nikitin =

Yuri Nikitin may refer to:

- Yuri Nikitin (author) (1939–2025), Russian sci-fi author
- Yuri Nikitin (gymnast) (born 1978), Ukrainian trampolinist
