= Andrzej Krukowski =

Polish actor (born 1961)

- Born: Augustów, Poland

Andrzej Krukowski (born November 30, 1961) is a Polish actor. In 2003 he starred in the film An Ancient Tale: When the Sun Was a God under Jerzy Hoffman.
