= Kraszewski House =

Historic house in Warsaw, Poland

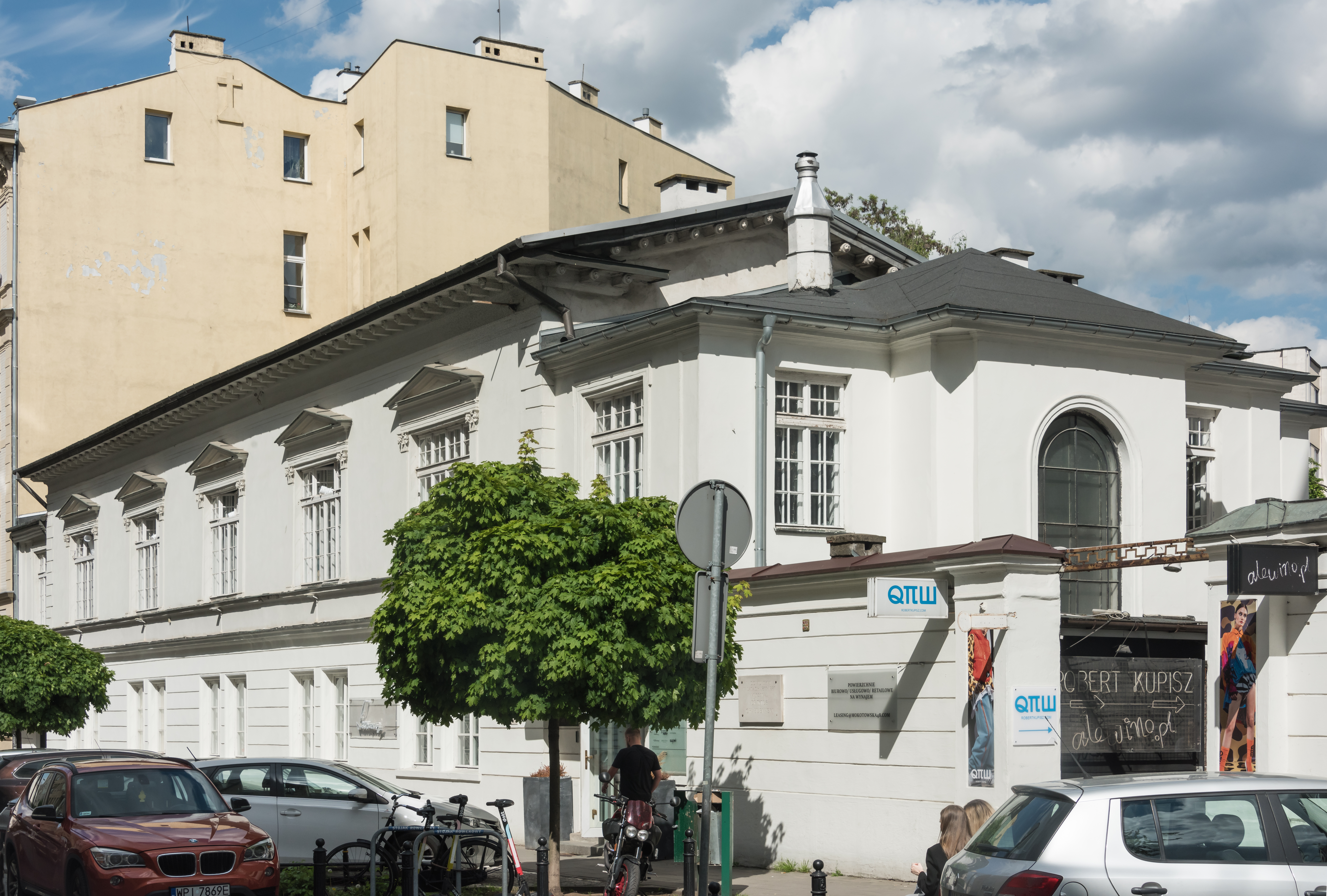
- The building in 2021.
- Interactive map of the Kraszewski House area

General information
- Type: House
- Architectural style: Neoclassical
- Location: Downtown, Warsaw, Poland, 48 Mokotowska Street
- Coordinates: 52°13′30.85″N 21°01′18.41″E
- Construction started: 1860
- Completed: 1860

Technical details
- Floor count: 2

Design and construction
- Architect: Francesco Maria Lanci

The Kraszewski House (Polish pronunciation: [kraˈʂɛf.ski]; Polish: Dom Kraszewskiego) is a historic neoclassical house in Warsaw, Poland, located at 48 Mokotowska Street, within the South Downtown neighbourhood. It was constructed in 1860.

== History ==
The building was constructed in 1863, as a residence of writer Józef Ignacy Kraszewski. It was designed in Neoclassical style by Francesco Maria Lanci. While living there, Kraszewski published such works as series of feuilletons titled Listy z Mokotowskiej ulicy (The Letters from Mokotowska Street). In 1863 it was sold to businessperson Leopold Stanisław Kronenberg, and later, to physician and scientist Tytus Chałubiński, who lived there from 1877 to 1887.

The building has survived the Second World War without serious damage. In 1957, it began housing the student club Hybrydy, and in 1965, it was entered into the heritage list. It remains the oldest standing building at Mokotowska Street.

Its frontal façade features two commemorative plaques dedicated to its former residents, Kraszewski (installed in 1961), and Chałubiński.

== Gallery ==
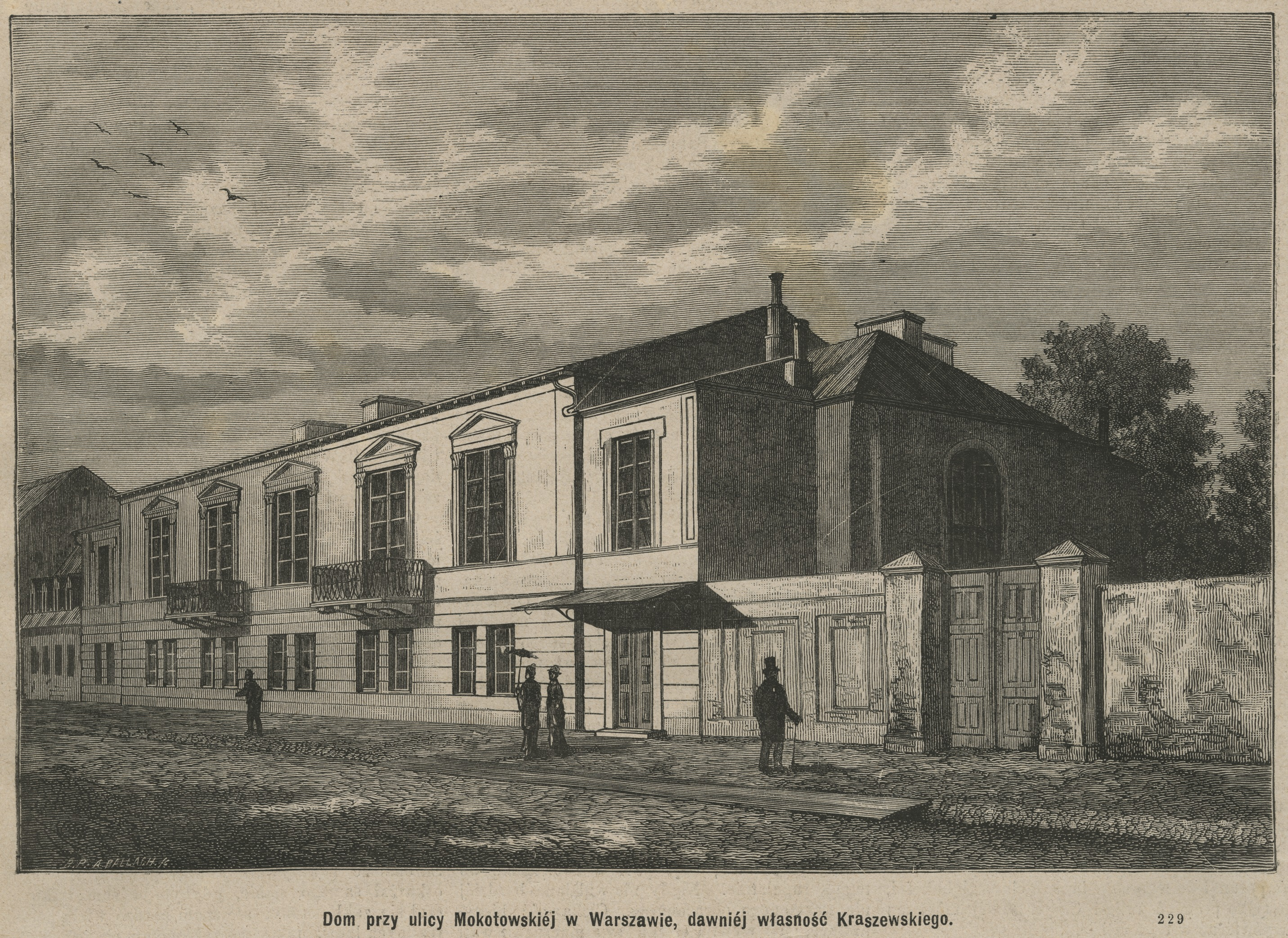
Illustration of the building from 1879.

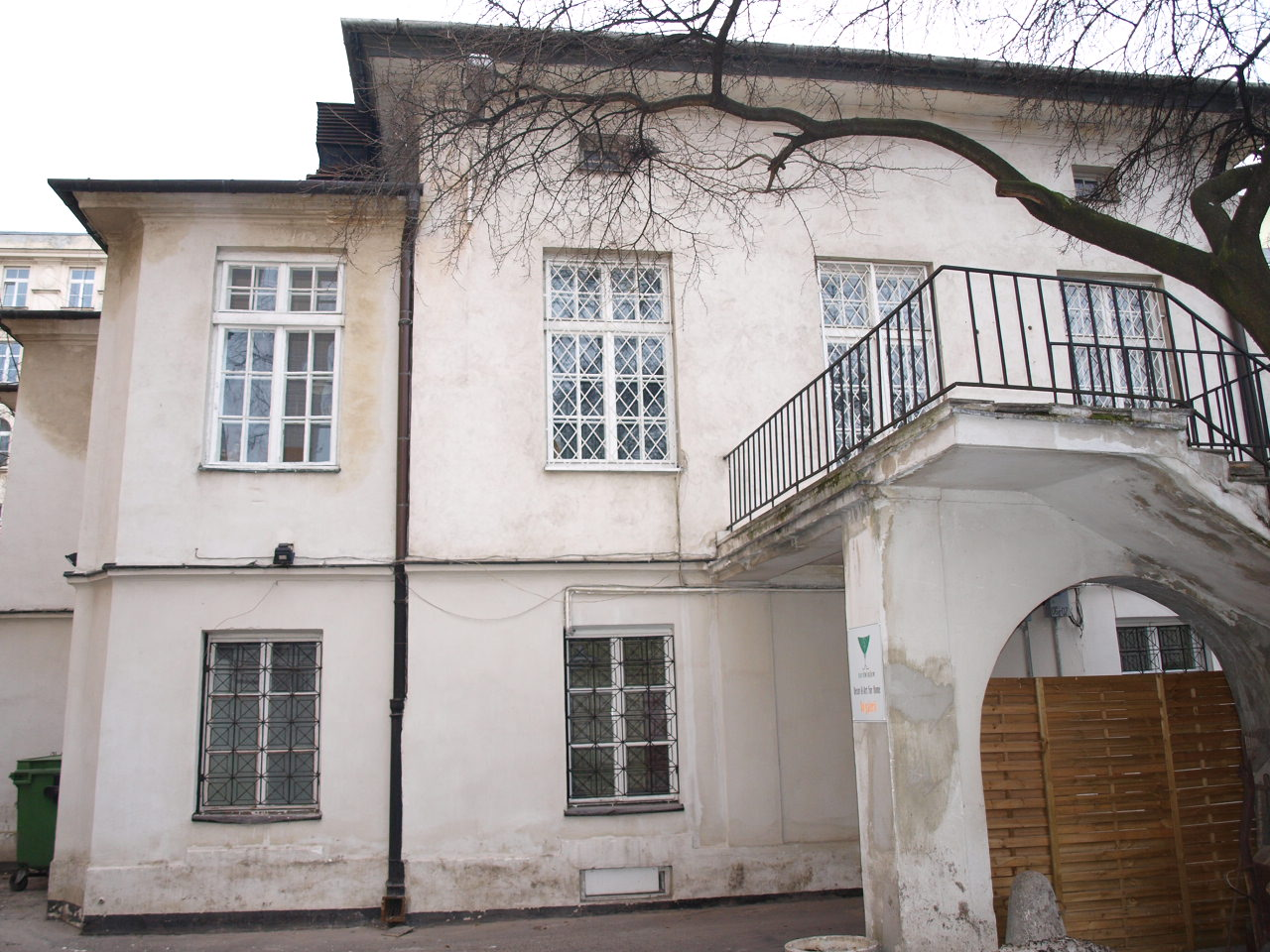
The building as seen from its courtyard.

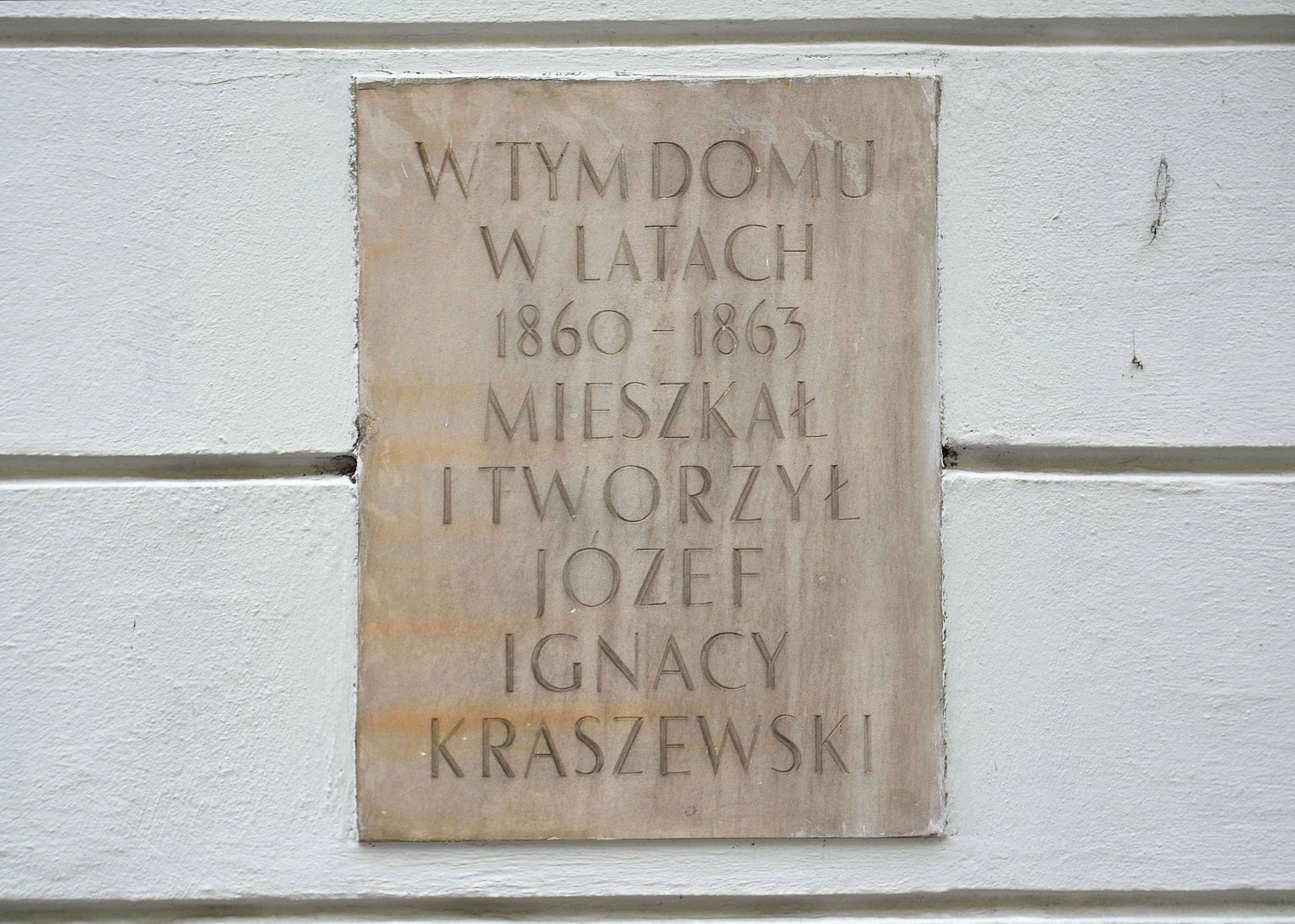
A commemorative plaque dedicated to Józef Ignacy Kraszewski.

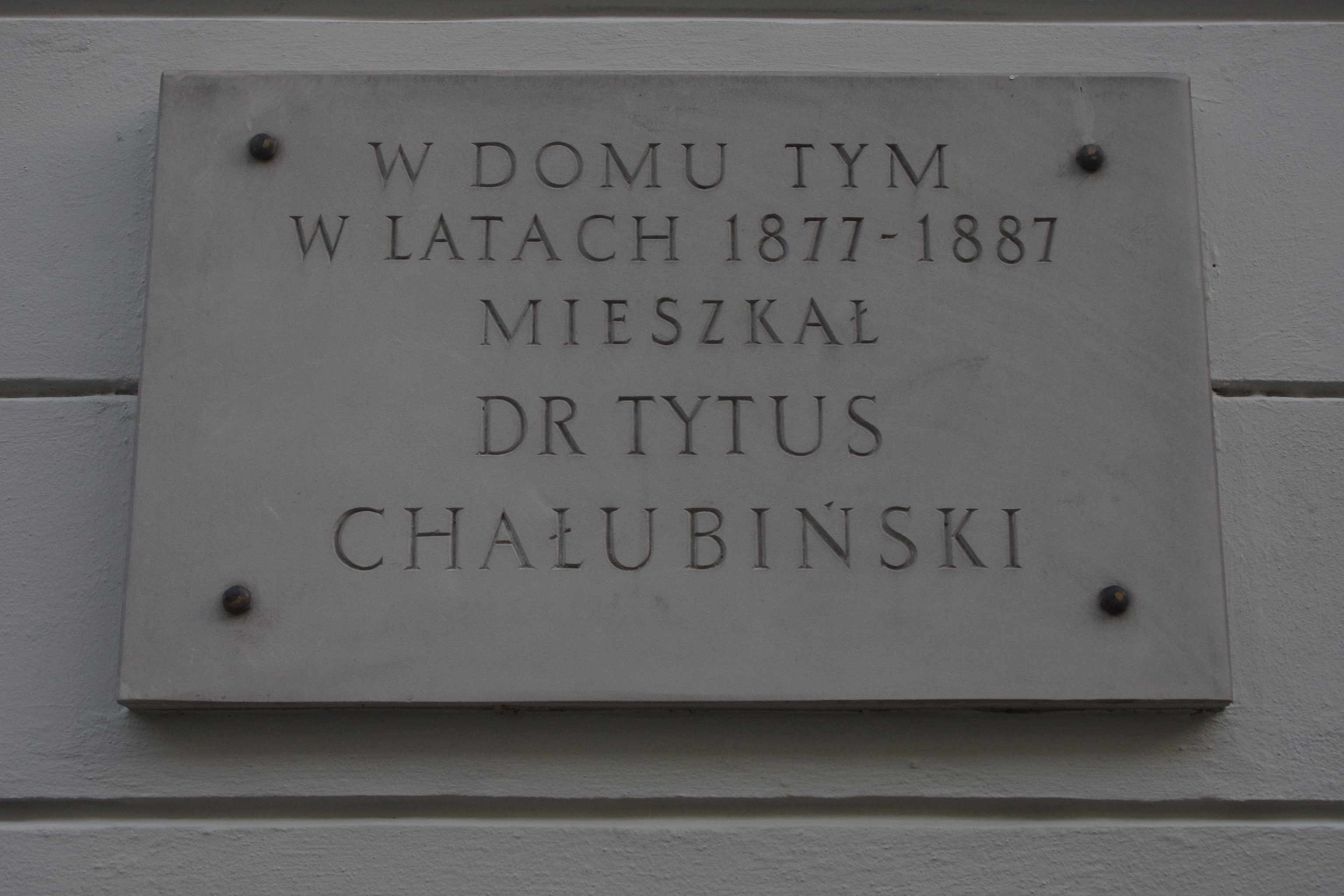
A commemorative plaque dedicated to Tytus Chałubiński.
