= Chata za wsią =

1842 novel by Józef Ignacy Kraszewski

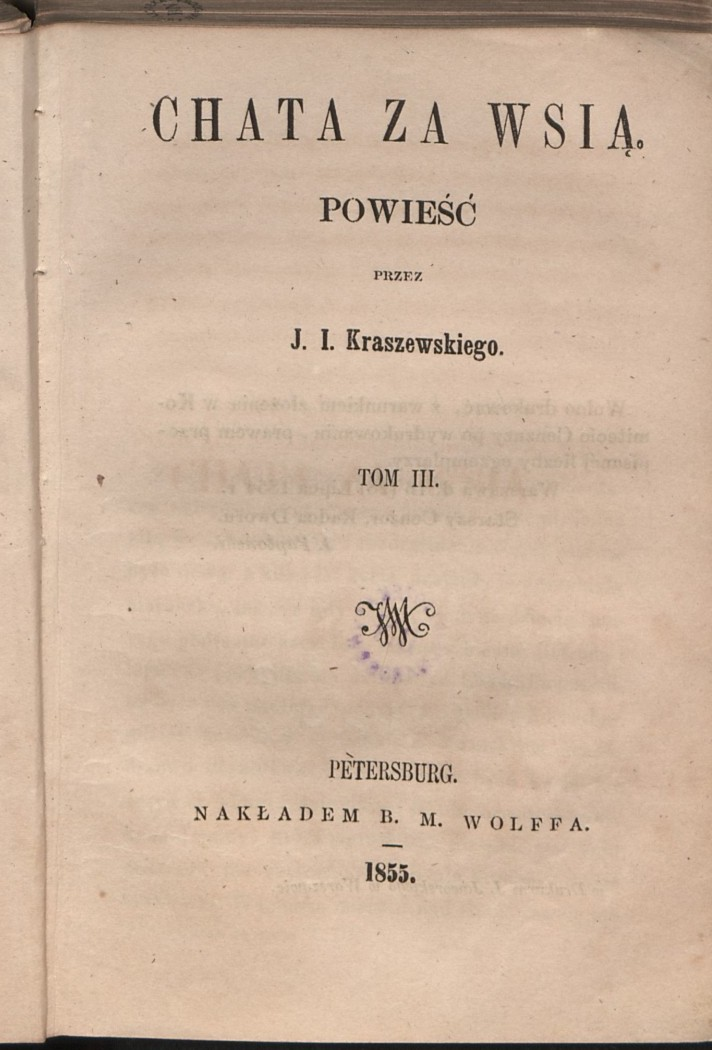
- Title page of Chata za wsią (The Cottage Outside the Village) by Józef Ignacy Kraszewski
- Language: Polish
- Published: 1853-54
- Publisher: Biblioteka Warszawska (The Warsaw Library)

Chata za wsią (variously translated to English as The Cottage/A Hut Outside/Behind/Beyond/Near the Village) is a novel by the prolific Polish novelist Józef Ignacy Kraszewski, written in 1842. It was serialized in the monthly, Biblioteka Warszawska (The Warsaw Library), over a two-year period in 1853–54. In 1854-55 it appeared in a three-volume book edition published by the St. Petersburg house of B.M. Wolff.

The book belongs to the folk-novel genre and depicts discrimination practiced against the Gypsy community. It is one of the most widely read novels by Kraszewski, and was adapted for theater, opera and film. It has been translated into Belarusian, Russian, French, Czech, German, Slovenian, and Ukrainian.

== Plot ==
The novel tells the tragic story of the Gypsy, Tumry, and his wife Motruna, daughter of the farmer Lepiuk. Tumry abandons his nomadic life for the sake of his beloved and decides to settle in the village, where he takes up blacksmithing. However, Motruna's marriage to the Gypsy is not to the liking of her father, who curses his daughter and turns the whole village community against them. The first cottage built by Tumry, next to the cemetery, is set afire by Motruna's envious father, and Tumry undertakes to rebuild their home. The young couple are discriminated against and are denied any help by the village. They receive support from the French mistress, and subsequent wife, of the village's squire, Adam, but she soon dies.

When the itinerant Gypsies return to the village and Aza, the squire's Gypsy former mistress regains her influence with him, assistance from the manor ceases. The sight of Aza, whom Tumry had once felt not indifferent about, rouses his hidden jealousy. Extreme poverty and inner emotional conflict lead to his suicide.

The widow and her daughter Marysia are looked after by the handicapped Janek, and later by the poor lady physician Sołoducha. But Mortuna dies, and her twelve-year-old daughter, with the support of Sołoducha and her blind husband Rataj, takes charge of her parents' farm.

A poor nobleman, Tomko Choiński, taken with the girl's kindness and strong character, marries the young Gypsy girl against his father's wishes, and they lead a happy life together.

The novel is characterized by great realism in its depiction of the mentality, customs, and life of village and Gypsy communities, and by its apt societal observations.

== Adaptations ==
In 1884 The Cottage outside the Village was adapted by Gabriela Zapolska for the theater. Alfred Nossig based, on the novel, his libretto for Ignacy Paderewski's 1901 opera Manru. Likewise based on the novel was the 1926 film Cyganka Aza (The Gypsy Woman Aza), directed by Artur Twardyjewicz.
