= Józef Ignacy Kraszewski =

Poland's most prolific novelist (1812–1887)

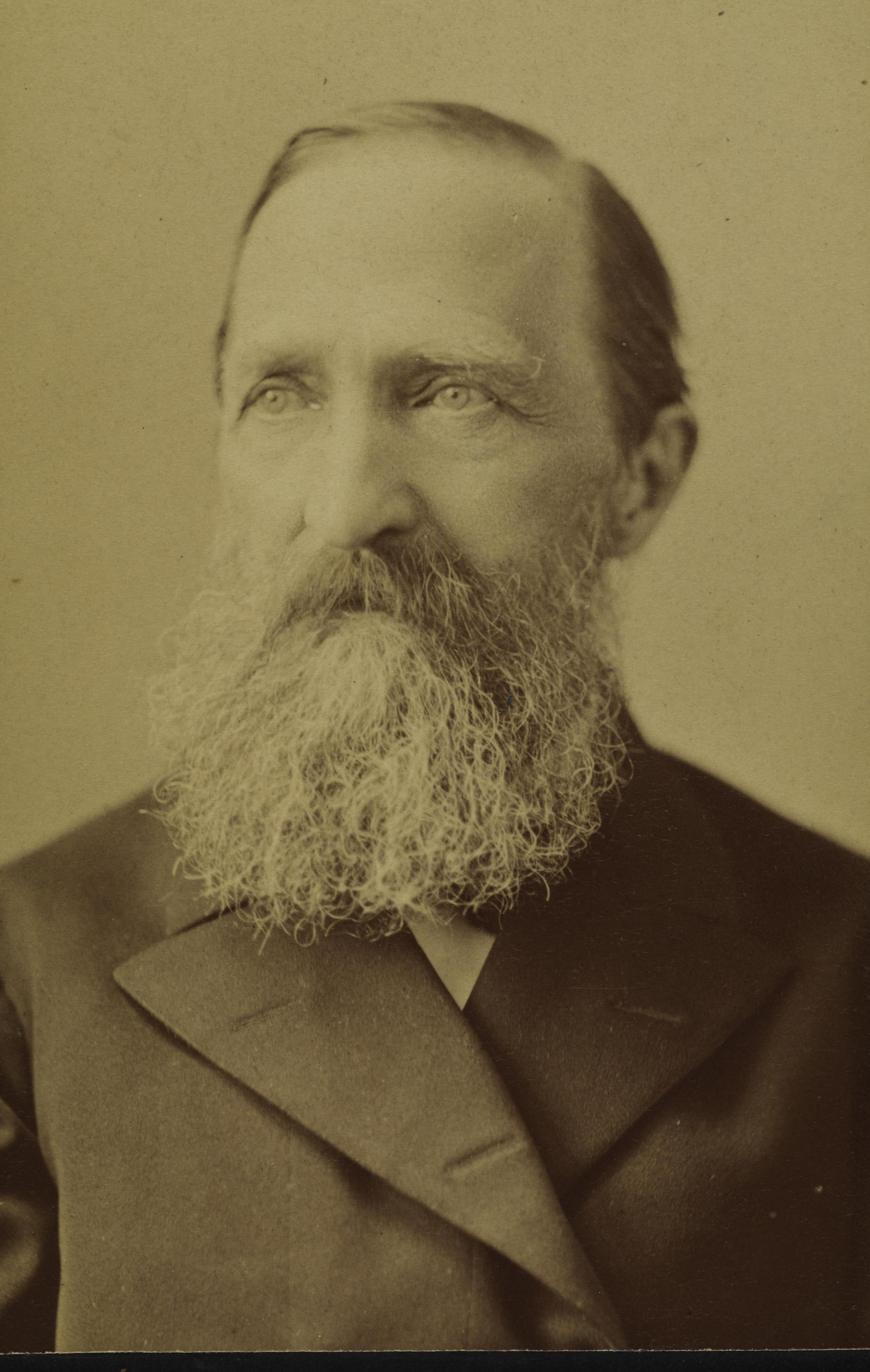
- Portrait of Kraszewski, State Archive in Łódź
- Born: 28 July 1812; Warsaw, Duchy of Warsaw
- Died: 19 March 1887 (aged 74); Geneva, Switzerland
- Occupations: Novelist, journalist and historian
- Spouse: Zofia Woroniczówna (m. 1838–1887)
- Children: 4
- Writing career
- Pen name: Bogdan Bolesławita, B.B., Kaniowa, Dr Omega, Kleofas Fakund Pasternak, and JIK
- Language: Polish
- Years active: 1830–1887
- Genres: Primarily novel, but also drama, poetry and non-fiction
- Notable works: Chata za Wsią (The Cottage Beyond the Village, 1854); Hrabina Cosel (The Countess Cosel, 1874); Stara Baśń (An Ancient Tale, 1876)

Józef Ignacy Kraszewski (Note: In his works, he used a number of pseudonyms, including Bogdan Bolesławita, B.B., Kaniowa, Dr Omega, Kleofas Fakund Pasternak, and JIK.) (28 July 1812 – 19 March 1887) was a Polish novelist, journalist, historian, publisher, painter, and musician.

Born in Warsaw into a noble family, he spent much of his youth with his maternal grandparents in Romanów and completed his education in various cities, including Vilnius. Kraszewski's literary career began in 1830, and he became an influential writer and journalist. Despite facing political challenges and imprisonment for his involvement in the November Uprising, he continued to support Polish independence. He spent his later years in Dresden, where he remained active in political and literary circles until his death in Geneva.

Kraszewski wrote over 200 novels and several hundred novellas, short stories, and art reviews, making him the most prolific writer in the history of Polish literature and one of the most prolific in world literature. He is best known for his historical novels, including an epic series on the history of Poland, comprising twenty-nine historical novels; and for novels about peasant life, critical of feudalism and serfdom. His works have been described as liberal-democratic but not radical, and as proto-Positivist.

== Life ==
=== Early life ===
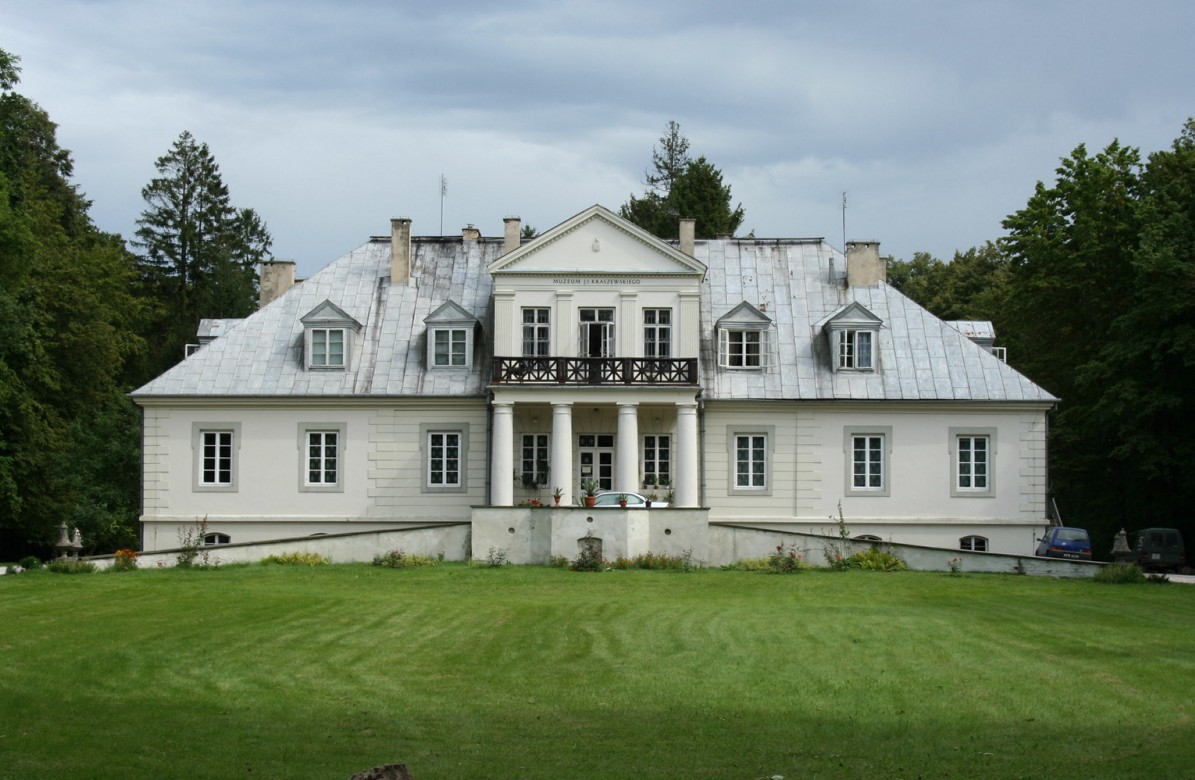
Romanów manor where Kraszewski grew up, now a Kraszewski Museum

Józef Ignacy Kraszewski was born in Warsaw on 28 July 1812 to a family of Polish nobility (szlachta (Note: Nobility in Polish)) bearing the Jastrzębiec coat of arms. He was the oldest son of Jan Kraszewski and Zofia and had four siblings, including artist Lucjan Kraszewski and writer Kajetan Kraszewski.

Józef Ignacy Kraszewski spent much of his youth in the house of his maternal grandparents in Romanów. His grandmother influenced him during this time and taught him French, history, and drawing.

From 1822 to 1826 he attended school in Biała Podlaska (the Biała Academy); from 1826 to 1827, a gymnasium (secondary school) in Lublin; and in 1829, in Svislach. He graduated from the Svislach gymnasium after passing his matura examinations there.

Beginning in 1829, he studied medicine at University of Vilnius; soon after, he transferred to the Faculty of Literature and Fine Arts. 1830 marked his literary debut with several short stories (Biografia sokalskiego organisty, Kotlety. Powieść prawdziwa, and Wieczór, czyli przypadki peruki), followed a year later with his first novel (Pan Walery).

While at university, he participated in a Polish-independence movement in support of the November 1830 Uprising. On 3 December 1830 he was arrested and was imprisoned until 19 March 1832. Thanks to his family's intervention, he avoided being conscripted into the Imperial Russian Army. After release, until July 1833 he lived in Vilnius under police supervision. He was then allowed to go to his father's estate in Doŭhaje (Dołhe), near Pruzhany in Volhynia. He also spent time, at Horodziec, in the library of Antoni Urbanowski, whom he would visit often in future.

=== Landowner ===
In 1836 Kraszewski was nominated to join the faculty of Kiev University as professor of Polish language, but the nomination was vetoed by the Russian government, which considered him politically suspect. In 1851 he was offered a professorship at the Jagiellonian University in Kraków, but this was again vetoed by the authorities, this time both Russian and Austrian.

In 1837 Kraszewski leased a farm in the village of Omelno. Eventually he also became a landowner in several nearby villages: Gródek, 1840–1848; Hubin, from 1848; and Kisiele, from 1854. As time passed, he steadily lost interest in farming and focused on his literary work. By the 1840s he was becoming well known as a prolific writer, and his works appeared in numerous Polish-language magazines and newspapers.

On 10 June 1838 he married Zofia Woroniczówna, niece of Jan Paweł Woronicz, former Bishop of Warsaw. They had four children: Konstancja, born 1839; Jan, born 1841; Franciszek, born 1843; and Augusta, born 1849.

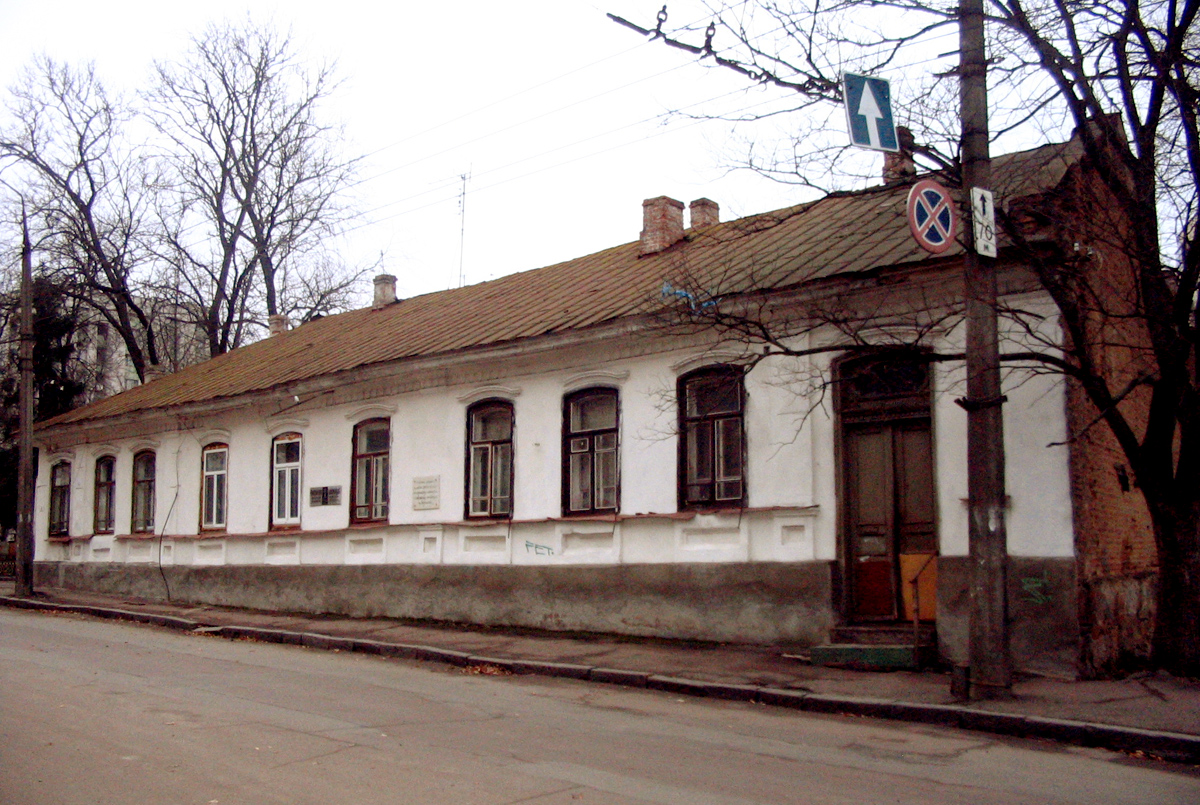
Kraszewski's Zhytomyr house

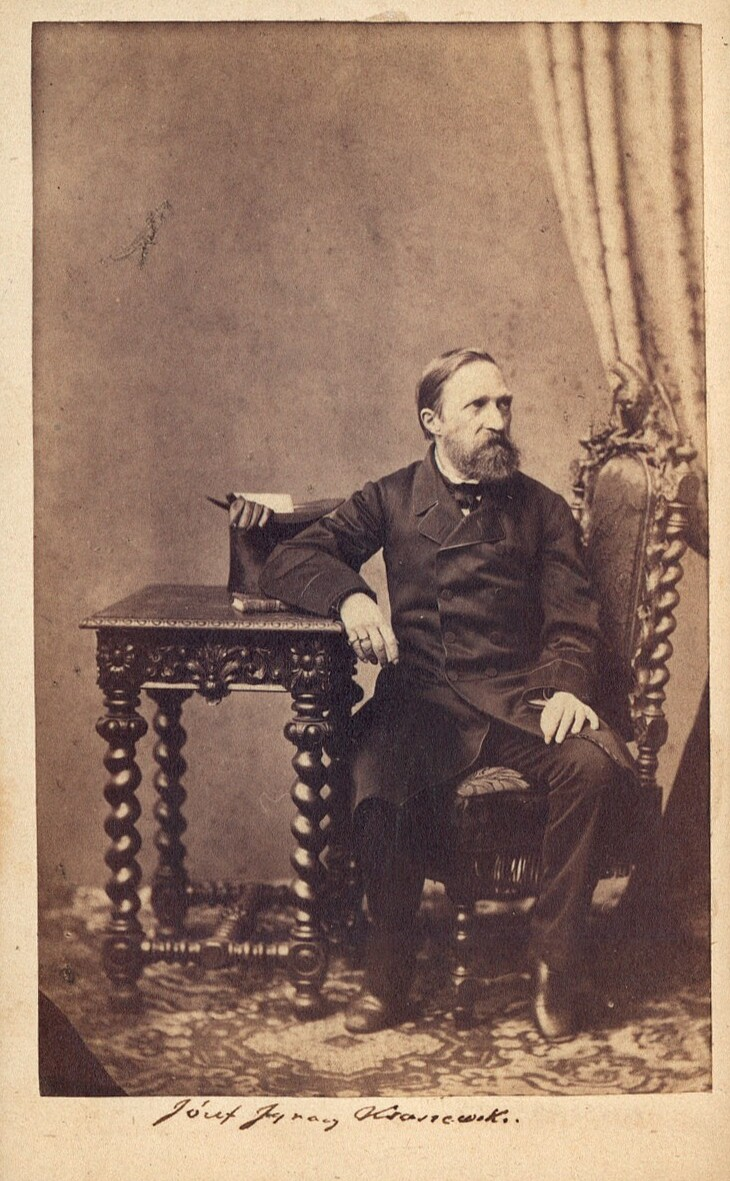
Kraszewski, 1861

Kraszewski travelled extensively, visiting and staying for extended periods in Warsaw (1846, 1851, 1855, 1859); in 1860 he bought a Warsaw townhouse, now known as the Kraszewski House), in Kiev (on numerous occasions), and in Odesa (1843, 1852). Through the 1850s and 1860s he periodically travelled through Western Europe (visiting Italy, German and France, among other places), and published travel accounts from them: Kartki z podróży 1858–1864 (Letters from Travels 1858–1864; 1866). His most significant trip occurred in 1858, when he travelled to Western Europe, visiting Austria, Belgium, Italy, Germany, and France. In Italy he was received by Pope Pius IX, who admonished him for his alleged liberal bias. This, however, likely heightened Kraszewski's critical view of the Holy State. His travels in the West also made him impatient with the feudal relations – particularly, serfdom – in eastern Poland.

In 1853, in an effort to better support and educate his four children, Kraszewski moved to his wife Zofia's inherited family estate near Zhytomyr, where he became, from 1856, school superintendent and director of the local theatre (Teatr Szlachty Wołyńskiej, or Zhytomyr Theater). At first popular with the local nobility, he became less so on account of his support for the abolition of serfdom.

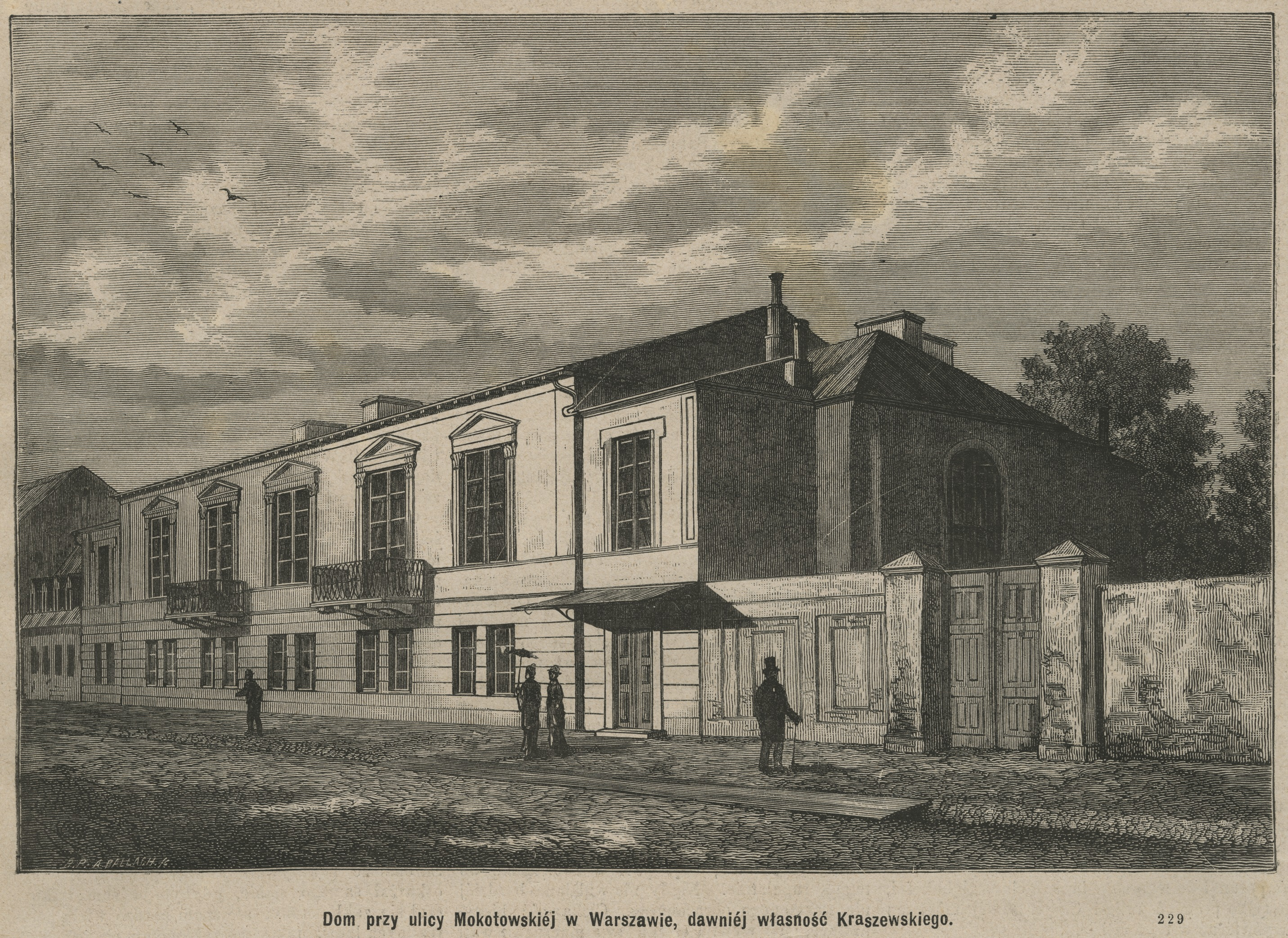
Kraszewski's extant house on Mokotowska Street, Warsaw

As a result, in February 1860 he moved to Warsaw to take up the editorship of Gazeta Polska, a position he had accepted the previous year, leaving his family in Zhytomyr. He grew increasingly distant from his wife, whom he would last see in 1863.

In 1858 he became a corresponding member of the Kraków Scientific Society.

In 1861 he became a member of the Delegacja Miejska, a patriotic civic organization based in Warsaw. Kraszewski's political stance was fairly moderate; while supporting the cause of Polish independence, he saw armed struggle as premature, and initially supported conciliatory negotiations with Russian authorities represented by Aleksander Wielopolski. His moderate centrist attitude had alienated him from many; Kraszewski has described himself as "too red for the whites, too white for the reds".

As tensions grew, Kraszewski found it increasingly difficult to remain moderate, and started to increasingly criticize the Russian authorities. For his criticism of censorship in December 1862, the Russian authorities forced him to resign his editorship of Gazeta Polska and ordered him to leave Congress Poland. Following the eruption of the January 1863 Uprising, on 3 February 1863 he fled Warsaw.

=== Saxony ===
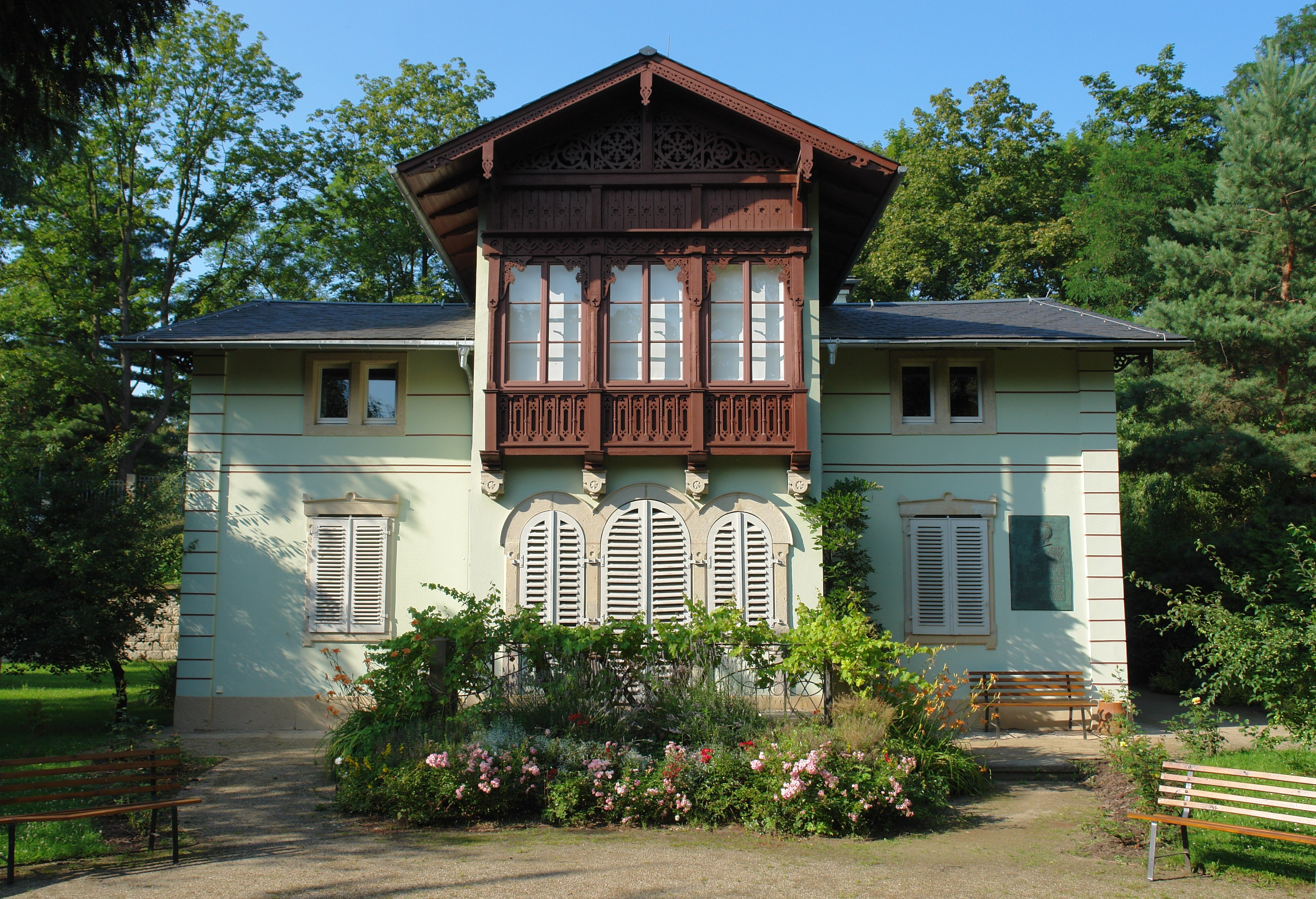
Kraszewski's Dresden house, now a museum

Leaving the Russian partition, Kraszewski arrived in Dresden. His wife and children remained in the Russian partition, and he would support them financially for many years. After his Russian passport expired, the Saxon authorities, in cooperation with the Russian embassy, attempted to declare him an illegal immigrant; to counter that, Kraszewski used a false French passport until he received Austrian citizenship in 1866.

In Dresden he connected with other Polish refugees and supported the January 1863 Uprising and the cause of Polish independence in the European press (often pseudonymously, to avoid trouble with the Saxon government). From 1870 to mid-1871, with his own funds, he published a weekly, Tydzień Polityczny, Naukowy, Literacki i Artystyczny, but eventually gave up on the endeavour due to financial difficulties.

From 1865 he travelled extensively in the Austrian partition of Poland, visiting Lviv, Kraków, Krynica, and Zakopane, and also visited Poznań in the Prussian Partition. He was again considered but rejected for professorships of Polish literature, at the SGH Warsaw School of Economics in 1865 and the Jagiellonian University in 1867.

Beginning in the 1870s, he increasingly suffered from health problems (kidney stone disease, asthma and bronchitis; some medical treatments for those included treatments with what would be today described as narcotics).

His application for Saxon citizenship was approved in 1869 and for a time he ran a printing press in Dresden. In 1871 he briefly campaigned to be elected a deputy from the Poznań region, but withdrew facing a strong opposition from the Polish conservative-clergy circles that he opposed in his newspaper polemics. In politics he kept representing the weak moderate faction.

Despite his health problems, he kept travelling, often invited to give lectures and attending academic conferences. In 1872 he became the member of the Academy of Learning. In 1873 he decided to become a full-time writer, and this year alone he wrote ten novels and two academic texts. He acquired a villa in Dresden. In 1879 he celebrated the 50th anniversary of his literary career in several cities in Europe, including in Kraków in a large event (on 2 to 7 October) during which he received the honorary degrees from Jagiellonian University as well as the Lviv University. In 1880 he attempted to travel to Warsaw but was denied permission by the Russian authorities. In 1882 he helped to found the educational institution Macierz Polska in Lwów.

He lived in Saxony until 1883, when he was arrested, while visiting Berlin, and accused of working for the French secret service, for whom he indeed worked since c. 1870. After being tried by the Reichsgericht in Leipzig in May 1884, he was sentenced to three and a half years imprisonment in Magdeburg (in the Magdeburg fortress). The case was seen as political, since Kraszewski was a vocal critic of German chancellor Otto von Bismarck, and Bismarck saw this as an opportunity to deal a blow to the Polish faction in Germany, even personally advocating a death sentence for the writer. While in prison, he was given preferential treatment - he was allowed to write, paint, and receive guests. Due to poor health, high profile of the case covered in European press, and requests from clemency from Kraszewski's influential friends (such as prince Antoni Wilhelm Radziwiłł and king of Italy, Umberto I), he was released on bail after a year and a half in 1885.

Rather than remain in Magdeburg, as his bail required, he moved to a new home in Sanremo, Italy; where he hoped to recuperate in peace. This, however, violated the terms of his release and led to the German government issuance of an arrest warrant for him. While in Sanremo, he witnessed the 1887 Liguria earthquake. When the possibility of extradition arose, he decided to move to Lausanne, Switzerland, where he bought a new house; however, he never arrived in it - he died in Hôtel de la Paix in Geneva, from pneumonia, on 19 March 1887, four days after his arrival there. His remains were transferred to Kraków, and after a large funeral on 18 April 1887 he was interred at "Skałka" Basilica, in the Crypt of Merit.

== Reception ==
Kraszewski is credited with over 600 or 700 works, including 223 novels, 20 dramas and many short stories. He is considered one of the most prolific Polish writers, and arguably one of the most prolific writers worldwide, and one of the first Polish writers whose works were widely translated (several dozens of his works were translated into Russian, Czech, German, and French; about a dozen, to Serbo-Croatian; several, to English, Italian, Lithuanian and to various Scandinavian languages). His novels, which were very popular even into the mid-20th and early 21st century, encouraged Polish literacy. Many of his works were compulsory readings in Polish schools. As of 2010, he was the most prolific writer in Poland by the number of published editions of his works (almost 900 editions published in the years 1944–2010, with the most popular title being his Stara Baśń - An Ancient Tale, which received 78 editions).

Czesław Miłosz, 1980 Nobel laureate Polish poet, in his The History of Polish Literature (1969) described him as best exemplifying the genre of historical novel in Polish literature. Miłosz further wrote that in Polish literature, Kraszewski founded the "new genre of fiction based upon documents and other sources where the faithful presentation of a given epoch is the main goal, and plot and characters are used simply as a bait for the readers". In popularizing Polish history, Miłosz drew a parallel between Kraszewski and Poland's foremost painter, Jan Matejko, whose works likewise focused on the history of Poland.

== Works ==
=== Novels ===
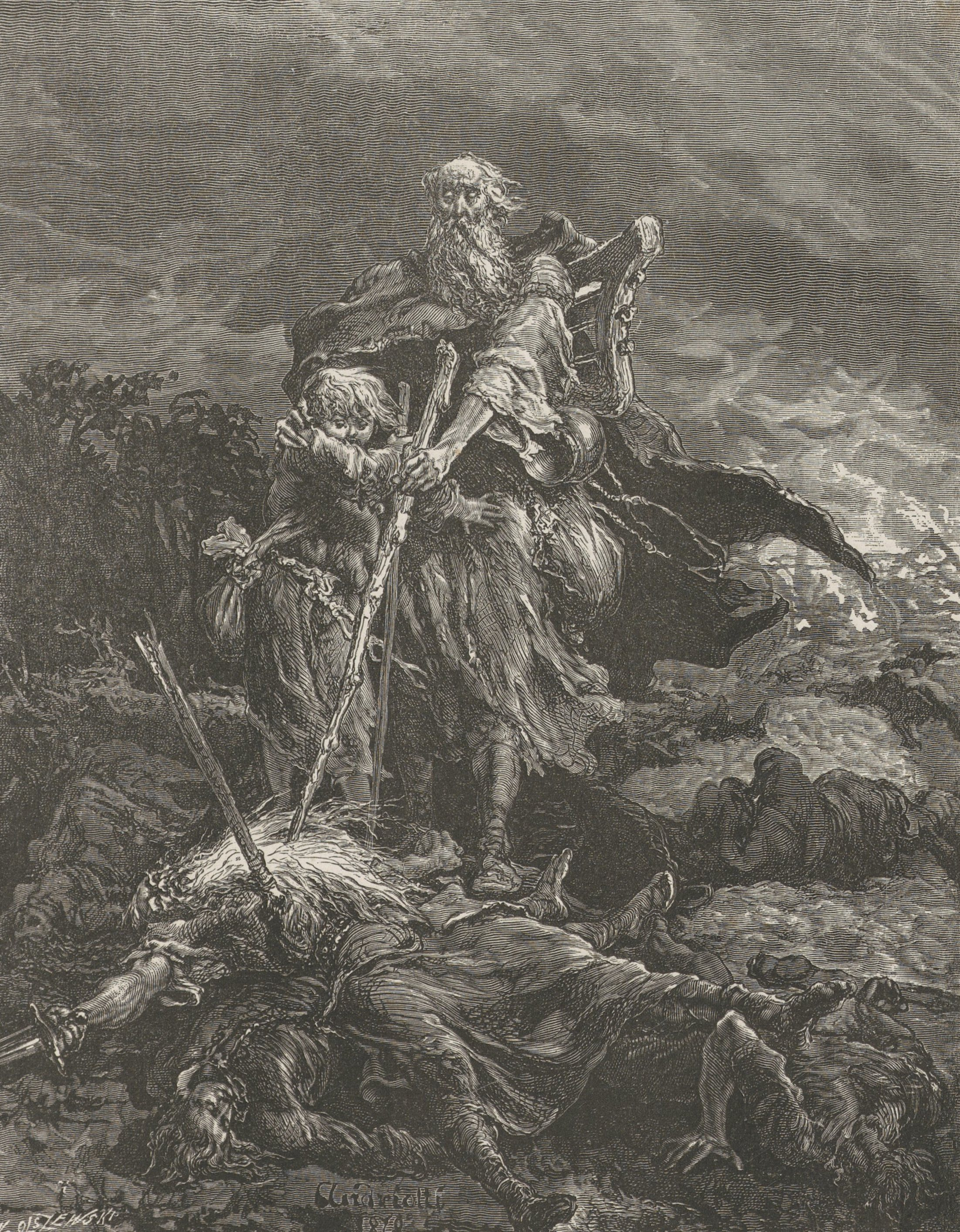
An 1879 Andriolli illustration for An Ancient Tale

Kraszewski is best known for his novels. Those could be divided into four major subgenres: historical novels, novels about the life of peasants, novels about the life of nobility and novels about artists. Out of those four, critics most often mention his historical and peasant novels.

His historical novels (94 total) include the epic series on the history of Poland, comprising twenty-nine historical novels in seventy-nine parts, covering the period of Polish prehistory (chronologically beginning with Stara Baśń, An Ancient Tale, 1876) to Kraszewski's era of partitions of the Polish–Lithuanian Commonwealth (Saskie ostatki - Saxon Remnants, 1890). Also significant are the three "Saxon Novels" (the Saxon trilogy), written between 1873 and 1883 in Dresden. Together, they create a detailed history of the Electorate of Saxony, from 1697 to 1763. Miłosz noted that the best of these are the first two, Hrabina Cosel (The Countess Cosel, 1874) and Brühl (1875).

His "peasant" novels, critical of serfdom and feudalism, are also often mentioned among his important contributions. Miłosz called them his most popular works and Wincenty Danek wrote that they are the works that have popularized his name. That series includes nine novels, out of which the most important are Historia Sawki (The Story of Sawka, 1842), Ulana (1843), Ostap Bondarczuk (1847), Chata za Wsią (The Cottage Beyond the Village, 1854), Jermoła: obrazki wiejskie (Jermoła: Pictures from a Village, 1857) and Historja kołka w płocie (The Story of a Peg in a Fence, 1860). Danek also noted, referring to Historia Sawki, that Kraszewski's works were the first time Polish literature discussed the oppression of Ukrainian peasants by the Polish nobility. Ulana in turn has been praised for its "bold and innovative analysis of the experiences of a peasant woman wronged by her lord".

Danek also praised Kraszewski's novels about the life of nobility, calling them groundbreaking for their criticism of nobility. He cited Latarnia czarnoksięska (Magical Lighthouse, 1843–1844), Interesa familijne (Family Business, 1853), Złote Jabłko (Golden Apple, 1853), and Dwa światy (Two Worlds, 1855) as the most important novels with that theme.

Examples of his works about the life of artists and the place of art in the wider society include Poeta i świat (The Poet and the World, 1839), Sfinks (Sphinx, 1842), Pamiętniki nieznajomego (Diaries of the Unknown, 1846), and Powieść bez tytułu (Novel without a Title, 1855). Some of those works are partly autobiographical.

While Danek described the above four subgenres as Kraszewski's major directions, he also noted that Kraszewski, a very prolific writer, wrote novels representing most if not all major contemporary genres: romances, adventures, comedies, satires, memoires and their pastiches, gawędas, crime novels, psychological novels, sensation novels, and others.

From the technical perspective, Danek noted that Kraszewski novels introduced elements of common speech to Polish literary language. With regards to Kraszewski's characters, Danek sees them as having relatively little psychological depth, but memorable due to vivid descriptions and mannerisms, and notes that Kraszewski was best at depicting strong female characters.

=== Other writings ===
Alongside novels, Kraszewski also wrote poetry, collected in Poezje (Poems, two volumes in 1838 and 1843), and Hymny boleści (Hymns of sorrow, 1857), as well as the lengthy poem-trilogy Anafielas (1843–1846). He also penned dramas, most notably the comedies Miód kasztelański (The Castellan's Honey, 1853) and Panie Kochanku (Mr. Lover, 1857). However, as noted by critics, Kraszewski was not particularly gifted in those dimensions.

In addition to his literary work, he was a contributor to many newspapers, journals and magazines, where he published works of fiction as well as reviews and articles on topics such as art, music and morality, and later, contemporary politics. Between 1841 and 1851 he published sixty volumes of the literary and scientific journal Athenaeum, printed in Vilnius. From 1836 to 1849 he was a contributor to the Tygodnik Petersburski (St. Petersburg Weekly). From 1842 to 1843 he contributed to Pielgrzym. Before 1859 he was a contributor to the Gazeta Warszawska. He was the editor of the Gazeta Polska (1859–62, from 1861, renamed to Gazeta Codzienna). In the 1860s and 1870s he wrote for, among others, Tygodnik Illustrowany, Kłosy, Bluszcz, Ruch Literacki, Tygodnik Mód i Powieści, Kraj, Biesiada Literacka, Dziennik Poznański, Wiek, and Kurier Warszawski.

While his works of fiction are the most enduring, his scholarly endeavours, primarily in the fields of history (particularly the history of Lithuania, and art history) and literary criticism, produced not only journal articles but a number of monogaphs (Wilno od początków jego do roku 1750, 1840–42; Litwa, starożytne dzieje, ustway, język, wiara, obyczaje, pieśni, 1848; Litwa starożytna, 1850; Dante, 1869; Polska w czasie trzech rozbiorów, 1873–1875; Krasicki, 1879); collected volumes of his articles (Studia literackie, 1842; Nowe studia literackie, 1843; Gawędy o literaturze i sztuce, 1857); and collections of primary materials (Pamiętniki Stanisława Augusta Poniatowskiego, 1870; Listy Jana Śniadeckiego, 1878; Listy Zygmunta Krasickiego, 1882–83).

He was also an editor, supervising publication of works by Kazimierz Brodziński (Pisma, 1872–1874) and translations of Shakespeare (Dzieła dramatyczne, 1875–1877).

=== Other arts ===
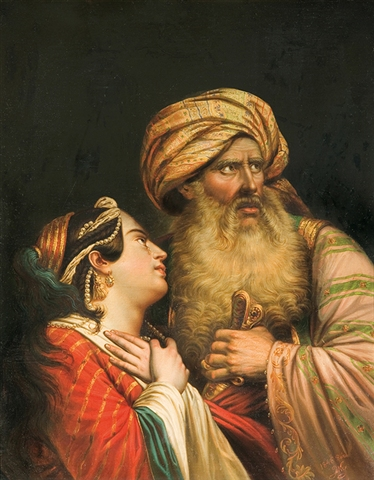
Eastern portrait, an 1846 painting by Kraszewski

While Kraszewski is best remembered as a writer, he was also an illustrator (he illustrated many of his works) and a painter (he displayed some of his paintings at local art exhibitions, and some were exhibited at others after his death). He also played piano and composed music (Pastusze piosenki - Shephards songs,1845).

He was also a collector, amassing a substantial collection of Polish drawings and etchings, which he sold in 1869 due to financial difficulties.

=== Themes ===
Kraszewski's early works describe the lives of ordinary people, and are thus a proto-Positivist critique of romantic traditions that focused on heroic individuals. Danek attributes his focus on reality to inspirations with classic novelists such as Charles Dickens, Honoré de Balzac and Nikolai Gogol. While his focus on history is similar to that of Walter Scott, Danek argues that it is sufficiently different to be considered not a copy of Scott's style. His early novels also show likely influence of Laurence Sterne, Fryderyk Skarbek, Jean Paul and E. T. A. Hoffmann.

A significant theme in his works was the criticism of feudal relationships, and a number of his novels featured peasant and female heroes. His works have been described as leaning liberal-democratic, but not radical. Danek writes that Kraszewski supported the ideal of egalitarianism. He often criticized nobility, particularly aristocracy, as unproductive and degenerative, and praised peasantry and the middle class.

His attitude to religion changed over time. He became more religious after marriage, likely because his relatives and friends of that time included several prominent religious figures, such as bishops Jan Paweł Woronicz and Ignacy Hołowiński and priest Stanisław Chołoniewski). Over time, however, he became opposed to more conservative values aligned with clergy and the church hierarchy (something for which he was criticized by the Pope).

In the realm of politics, he supported the cause of Polish independence, but opposed armed struggle, which in his literary works he depicted as unlikely to succeed. He became more supportive of it in his newspaper polemics after the January Uprising started, effectively accepting it as a fait accompli. Some of his novels and articles have been described as critical of Germany, reflecting a push against the policies of Germanization; this theme was particularly visible in his novels such as Na Wschodzie (In the East, 1866), Dziadunio (Grandpa, 1869), Mogilna (1871) i Nad Spreą (At Sprea, 1874), and many of his historical novels, which covered often antagonistic Polish-German relations (ex. Polish-Teutonic Wars). Others were critical of Russia; in particular his Rachunki Bolesławity (Bolesławita's accounts,1867) portrayed Russia as a primitive, barbaric country. He also criticized Russian ideology of panslavism, aiming at unifying all Slavic lands, and supported self-determination for Belorussians and Ukrainians. As one of the major themes of his works was Lithuania, and his works, although written in Polish, are seen as contributing to the Lithuanian National Revival.

== Remembrance ==
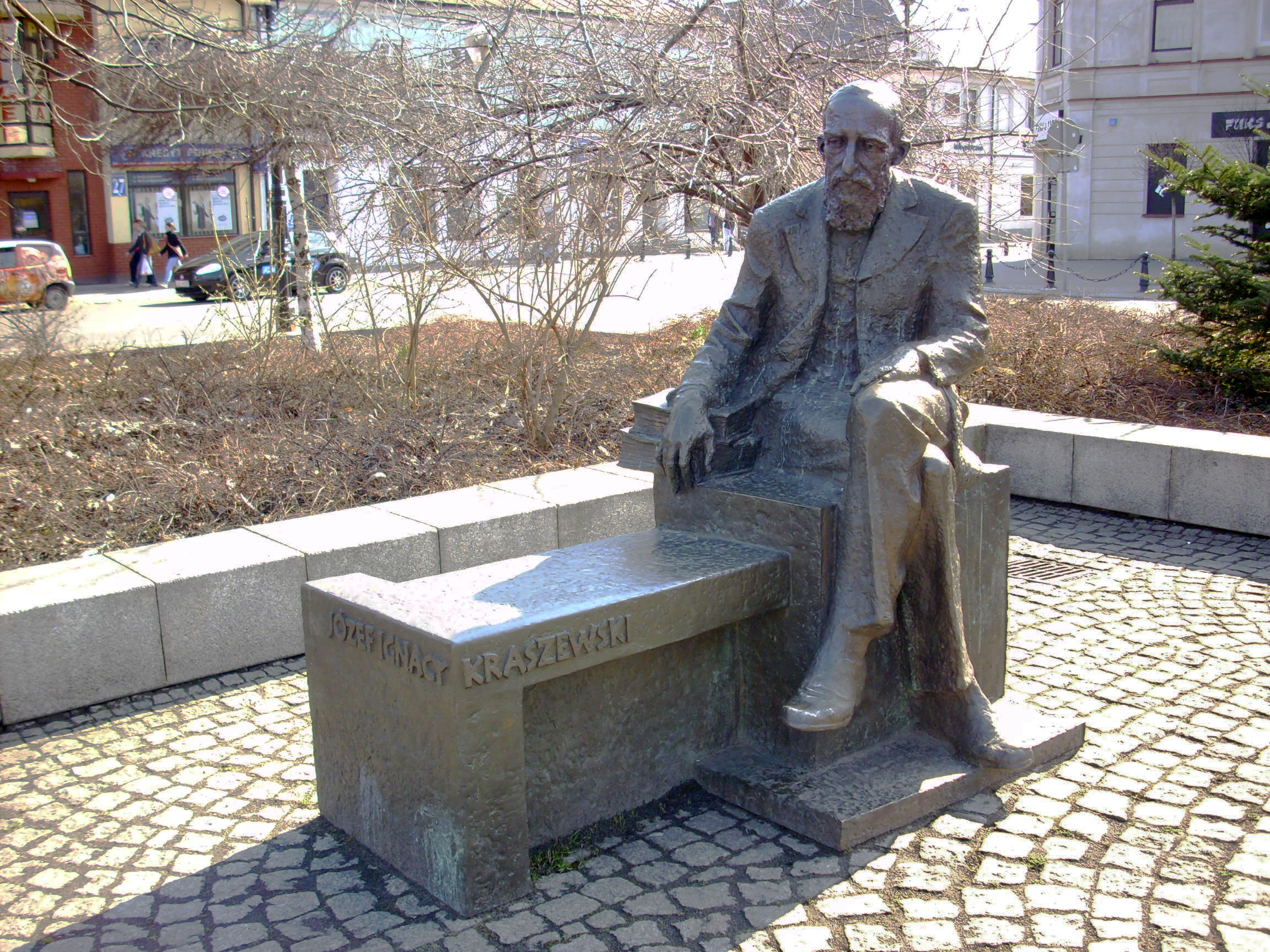
Kraszewski monument in Biała Podlaska

Kraszewski's works were adapted into numerous dramas; Stanisław Moniuszko composed music for the drama version of Anafielas third part, Witolorauda.

The first of his books to be adapted for film was Chata za wsią, adapted into Cyganka Aza (1926). The second was Hrabina Cosel, resulting in Countess Cosel (1968), directed by Jerzy Antczak, with Jadwiga Barańska in the title role. Twenty years later, in East Germany, the DEFA presented a six-part television series, the Saxon Trilogy, including a new version of Gräfin Cosel, directed by Hans-Joachim Kasprzik. In 2003, Stara Baśń was adapted to the movie An Ancient Tale: When the Sun Was a God, directed by Jerzy Hoffman.

Monuments to Kraszewski exist in Biała Podlaska (Józef Ignacy Kraszewski's bench in Biała Podlaska) and Krynica-Zdrój (Kraszewski's bench in Krynica-Zdrój); many other places feature memorial plaques dedicated to him.

Since 1960, his former home in Dresden has been the Kraszewski-Museum. Another museum dedicated to him was opened in 1962 in Romanów (the Józef Ignacy Kraszewski Museum in Romanów).

== See also ==
- List of Poles
