= Kraszewo =

Kraszewo may refer to the following places:

- Kraszewo, Masovian Voivodeship (east-central Poland)
- Kraszewo, Pomeranian Voivodeship (north Poland)
- Kraszewo, Działdowo County in Warmian-Masurian Voivodeship (north Poland)
- Kraszewo, Lidzbark County in Warmian-Masurian Voivodeship (north Poland)
