= Lucjan Kraszewski =

Polish artist and photographer

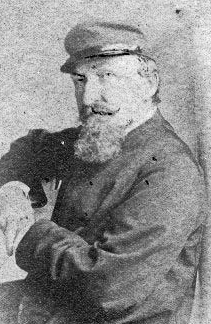
Lucjan Kraszewski

Lucjan Kraszewski (24 July 1820 – 2 February 1892) was a Polish artist and photographer who participated in the January Uprising. He was a younger brother of Józef Ignacy Kraszewski.

== Life a ==
He was from a noble family, bearing the Jastrzębiec coat of arms; born in Pruzhany to Jan Kraszewski, a major landowner, and his wife, Zofia Kraszewska, née Malska. His older brother, Józef, and his younger brother, Kajetan, were both popular authors. He originally attended the monastery school near Pruzhany, then the gymnasium in Svislach. Later, he was enrolled in the natural sciences department at the Imperial University of Dorpat. After graduating, he returned to his family's estate and married Stefania Sulkouskaya.

During his time at the university, he had become interested in drawing and painting. In 1857, he was able to make a tour of art galleries in Belgium, Holland, and Germany, where he also developed an interest in photography.

After participating in the January Uprising, he was exiled to Kungur, in the Perm Governorate, and his estate was confiscated. Three years later he was transported, under police supervision, to Tsivilsk, in the Kazan Governorate, where he set up a small photography studio. Many of his photographs from there have survived, and provide an important cultural record of 19th-century Chuvashia.

In 1868, he received permission to return to Poland. He sold his remaining share of the family's property to Kajetan, and moved to his wife Stefania's family estate, near Honiatycze; dividing his time between there and Warsaw. He died at the estate, and was interred in Wisznice.

== Works ==
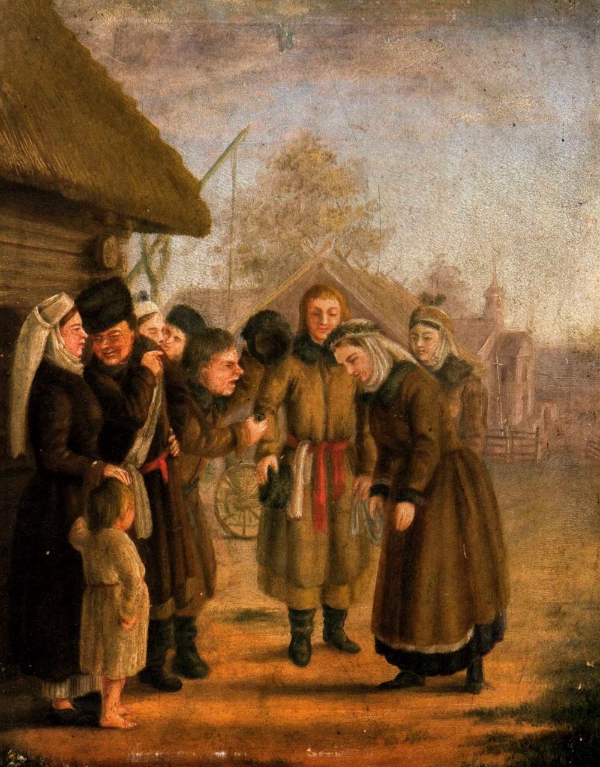
Rural customs, ca. 1850

He created drawings, watercolors, and graphics; illustrating the writings of his brother, Józef. Most of his works depict genre scenes from Poland, Lithuania, and what is now Belarus. His favorite place to paint was in the area around Grodno. He was one of the first photographers in that area. His works are in the collections of the National Museum, Warsaw, and the National Academy of Sciences of Ukraine. None are currently in Belarus.

== See also ==
- List of Poles
