= An Ancient Tale: When the Sun Was a God =

- Theatrical release poster
- Directed by: Jerzy Hoffman
- Written by: Józef Hen, Jerzy Hoffman
- Produced by: Jerzy R. Michaluk, Jerzy Hoffman
- Starring: Bohdan Stupka, Michał Żebrowski, Daniel Olbrychski
- Cinematography: Pawel Lebieszew, Jerzy Gościk
- Edited by: Cezary Grzesiuk
- Music by: Krzesimir Dębski
- Release date: 2003
- Running time: 135 minutes
- Country: Poland
- Language: Polish
- Box office: $2,626,649

An Ancient Tale: When the Sun Was a God (Polish: Stara baśń: Kiedy słońce było bogiem) is a 2003 Polish film, directed by Jerzy Hoffman. The film is based on an 1876 novel, Stara baśń, by Józef Ignacy Kraszewski.

== Cast ==
- Bohdan Stupka as Popiel
- Ryszard Filipski as Wisz
- Jerzy Trela as Wizun
- Ewa Wiśniewska as Jarucha
- Anna Dymna as Jaga
- Małgorzata Foremniak as Księżna
- Maciej Kozłowski as Smerda
- Michał Żebrowski as Ziemek
- Katarzyna Bujakiewicz as Mila
- Daniel Olbrychski as Piastun
- Maria Niklińska as Żywia
- Andrzej Pieczyński as Znosek
- Marina Aleksandrova as Dziwa
- Mariusz Drężek as Bratanek
- Marcin Mroczek as Leszek
- Andrzej Krukowski as Ludek
- Maciej Zakościelny as Wramot
- Rafał Mroczek as Zdobek
- Dariusz Juzyszyn as Jarl Sigvald
- Wiktor Zborowski as Viking-Translator
- Ryszard Ronczewski as Miłosz
- Jan Prochyra as Mirsz
- Adam Graczyk as Sambor
- Krystyna Feldman as wróżka
- Michał Chorosiński as Bratanek
- Jerzy Braszka as Pachołek Ziemka

== See also ==
- List of Polish films
- List of historical drama films
