= Yuri Nikitin (author) =

Russian science fiction and fantasy writer (1939–2025)

- Юрий Александрович Никитин
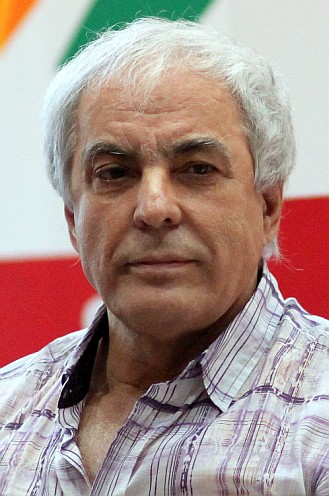
- Nikitin in 2010
- Born: 30 November 1939; Kharkov, Ukrainian SSR, Soviet Union
- Died: 23 May 2025 (aged 85)
- Citizenship: Soviet, Russian
- Writing career
- Pen name: Gaius Julius Orlovsky
- Years active: 1973–2025
- Genres: Science fiction, social science fiction, Slavic fantasy
- Website: Официальный сайт

Yuri Aleksandrovich Nikitin (Russian: Юрий Александрович Никитин; 30 November 1939 – 23 May 2025) was a Russian writer of science fiction, historical fiction, and Slavic fantasy.

Although he was active in science fiction before perestroika, the recognition came when he wrote a Slavic fantasy novel, The Three from the Forest (Russian: Трое из Леса). One of the protagonists is a character based on the Russian Rurikid Prince Oleg of Novgorod, who is a mainstay of many sequels. Nikitin also wrote a couple of novels about Vladimir the Great. Nikitin created a website called Inn (Russian: Корчма) as a community portal to help young writers.

Nikitin's books have a distinct, free, and often intentionally primitive and repetitive style with many jokes, reflecting his intent to keep the reader on topic and carry his ideas through. His later books develop the idea of becoming a transhuman through self-development and survival of the spiritually fittest.

According to the literary critic Sergei Chuprinin, Nikitin, with his series of novels "Three from the Forest", is one of the founders of Slavic fantasy. Some of Nikitin's works reproduce the ideas of Slavic neopaganism.

== Early life and career ==
Yuri Nikitin was born on 30 November 1939, in Kharkiv, Ukrainian SSR, an only child in a low-income family. His father joined the Soviet army as a volunteer in 1941 and died in World War II, and his mother never married again. A weaver in a local factory, she raised her son independently, with the only help of her elderly parents. The four lived in a small rustic house in Zhuravlyovka, a half-rural suburb of Kharkiv. Nikitin's grandfather was a well-known carpenter, joiner, and shoemaker in the local area. The family could barely make ends meet: as Nikitin recalled later, in the post-war time they had to eat soup made from potato peelings disposed of by their neighbors.

Living in poverty and starvation affected the young Nikitin's health badly. He was born with a heart disease and got rickets, rheumatism, and chronic tonsillitis. At the age of 15, doctors told Nikitin that he would not live for more than six months, but in the next year, he overcame illnesses and improved his health greatly through yoga, hard physical exercise, and a strict diet.

From his earliest years, Nikitin was bilingual in Ukrainian and Russian, common for people in Eastern Ukraine. Later, he also learned English and Polish on his own to be able to read books by foreign sci-fi writers that were not translated in the USSR.

At 16, Nikitin was expelled from school for scuffling and hooliganism and got his first job as a metalworker in a local plant. Two years later, he became a lumberman and rafter in the construction sites of the Russian Far North, then a geologist exploring the Ussuri krai with its swampy coniferous forests, great rivers, and many places where no human had ever been before. He also explored the Sikhote-Alin, the Far East, and the Primorye. Bright impressions of those journeys inspired his Saveliy series of short science-fiction stories featuring a hunter from taiga who meets aliens and teaches the art of hunting to them.

In 1964, Nikitin returned to Kharkiv and continued working temporary jobs, often low-skilled and involving hard physical work, such as a foundry worker at a factory. He lingered in each one for hardly more than a year, mainly because of his wish to try something different. As he commented later in I am 65, his autobiography, “I've never had a job I hated to do. Furthermore, I knew that whatever I did was temporary, that my true destiny was great and my current job nothing but an adventure I'd like to recall someday.”

During 1964–65, Nikitin completed his secondary education as an external student in an evening school and seriously considered his full-time career choice. He picked up sports, music, painting, and writing as the most promising options for the kind of person he was: an ambitious man of 25 with no higher education. By 1967, he achieved the master-of-sports rank in canoeing, first grades in boxing, sambo, track and field athletics, learned to play the violin, and sold several cartoons to local magazines.

Nikitin wrote his very first stories in 1965, just for fun. Those were humorous and short: the shortest only counted 28 words. All of them were purchased by Russian and Ukrainian magazines. In the next several years, Nikitin created many short sci-fi stories (Saveliy series, Makivchuck the Space Ranger series, and many others) with the same distinctive features: a new, unusual subject, lively characters, fast-changing events, and a striking ending. In 1973, they were collected to make Nikitin's first book, The Man Who Changed the World, an apparent success. Many stories were translated into foreign languages and published in the countries of the Warsaw Pact. However, the Nikitin's earnings were insufficient to live and support the family, so he retained his main occupation as a foundry worker until 1976.

Nikitin's second book, Fire Worshippers, belongs to the genre of industrial novels, which were extremely popular in the Soviet Union. Nikitin wrote it on a bet with his fellow writers, who said that writing industrial novels was far more difficult than science fiction and that he was hardly capable of it. Nikitin bet he would write such a novel in six months and won. The book received several high literary prizes, and a TV series was made based on it. The novel featured real people – Nikitin's co-workers in the foundry. He even used their real names, and they were pleased.

In 1976, Nikitin joined the Communist Party and the Union of Soviet Writers. He was the first ever science fiction writer allowed and invited insistently to do it. The management of both those organizations had rather slighting attitudes towards science fiction in general, but they highly appreciated Fire Worshippers and the fact that Nikitin was a workman without higher education: it was congruent with the aims of communist propaganda.

Nikitin used his newly gained opportunities and influence to found the Speculative Fiction Fan Club (SFFC) (Russian: Клуб Любителей Фантастики, КЛФ) in Kharkiv. It was designed as a communication platform for sci-fi writers, scientists, and avid readers, a place for literature discussions and critics, and a means to help young sci-fi authors improve their writing skills and get their stories published. In 2003, Nikitin also created SFFC in Moscow.

In 1979, Nikitin wrote his third book, The Golden Rapier: a historical novel about Alexander Zasyadko (1774–1837), a Russian general of Ukrainian origin and inventor of rocket weapons. The book's contents were found inappropriate by Leonid Kravchuk, the head of the agitprop department of the Communist Party of Ukraine. He accused Nikitin of Ukrainian nationalism and ordered the destruction of all the printed copies of the book.

For his scandalous novel, Nikitin was dismissed from his office in the Union of Writers, banned from publishing in Ukraine, and his name was forbidden from being mentioned in the local media. The same year, he entered the prestigious Higher Literary Courses (HLC) at the Literary Institute, Moscow. The pro-rector of HLC had read The Golden Rapier and so liked it that he accepted Nikitin despite the communist officials strongly recommending not to do it.

In 1981, Nikitin completed HLC and returned to Kharkiv but could not resume his writing work. Whatever he wrote was rejected by publishers for the reason that his name was blacklisted. In 1985, this made him move to Moscow. There Nikitin published his fourth book, The Radiant Far Palace, a collection of short science fiction and fantasy stories.

During perestroika, when some degree of free enterprise was allowed to Soviet citizens, Nikitin, in association with other writers, founded Fatherland (Russian: Отечество), one of the first cooperative publishing houses in the country. He worked as editor-in-chief there for a while, then established his own private publishing house, Zmey Gorynych (Ravlik) (Russian: Змей Горыныч), later re-organized into Ravlik (Russian: Равлик). It specialized in English and American science fiction, almost unknown to Soviet readers before. Nikitin selected books for translation and publishing from his home library, which included over 5,000 science fiction books in English. As he explained later, "I could prepare a hundred volumes of selected sci-fi works as there was no book in my library that I hadn’t read from cover to cover."

By then, Nikitin had half a dozen of his novels written but unpublished. In the USSR, an author was allowed to release up to one book in three years. Another reason publishers rejected Nikitin's manuscripts was that his protagonists were immortal and happy about it. The Soviet editorial policy was to publish only the works that showed immortality as terrible and abominable; all immortal heroes were expected to repent and commit suicide. In 1992, Nikitin printed the first of those novels, The Three from the Forest, in Ravlik – and it was a great success. Each next book of this series became a bestseller. Ravlik switched almost exclusively to publishing books by Nikitin.

In the late 1990s, Nikitin abandoned his publishing business and focused entirely on writing books. Major publishing houses purchased the rights for them: at first Centrpolygraph (Russian: Центрполиграф), then Eksmo (Russian: Эксмо).

Some Moscow neopagans revere Nikitin as a teacher in the craft of writing. In 2001, Nikitin attended a neopagan celebration.

Nikitin did not give interviews for a long time, but some unscrupulous sites published fabricated interviews. In 2007, his first personally verified interview was published on the internet.

On 30 March 2014, during the Eksmo Book Festival in Moscow, Nikitin officially confessed his writing of The Adventures of Sir Richard Longarms, an epic fantasy novel series ongoing since 2001 with over 7,000,000 copies sold in Russia and other countries, under the pen name of Gaius Julius Orlovsky. Before the reveal, the similarity of style, turns of speech, and ideas promoted in their novels, as well as the presence of Gaius Julius as the pseudonym of the hero of one of Nikitin's stories, all led to the logical conclusion about the identity Orlovsky, which was supported by some literary sites.

Nikitin was the author of more than 100 books (including those published under the pen name of Gaius Julius Orlovsky) and one of the most commercially successful Russian writers, comparable to Vasili Golovachov and Sergei Lukyanenko.

== Works and themes ==
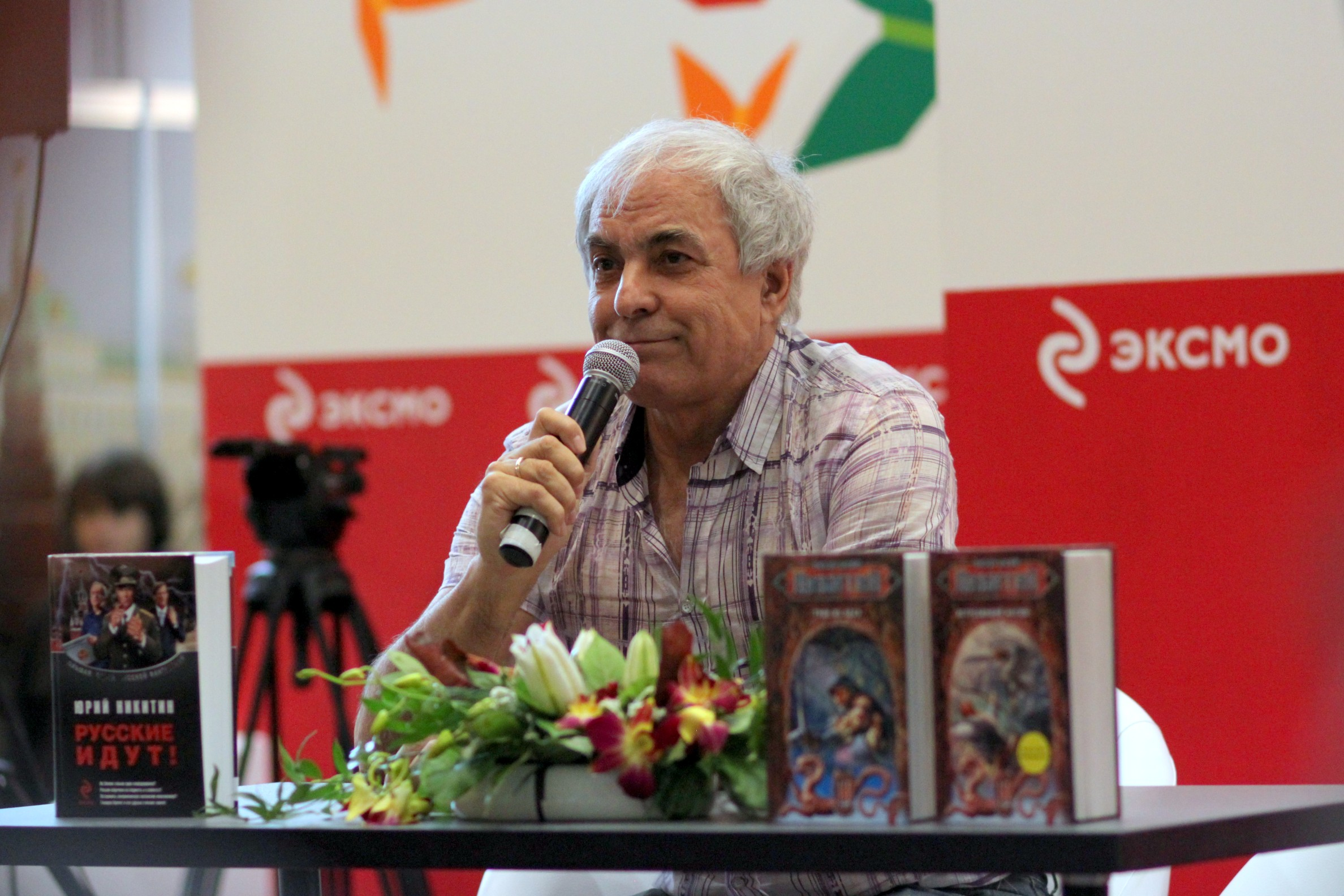
Nikitin presenting his books at Moscow International Book Fair 2010

The World of SFF (Russian: Мир фантастики), the largest and most reputable Russian SFF magazine, writes about Nikitin: "It is hard to find another writer whose novels encompass such different themes and target audiences – and inspire such a contradictory public response." Nikitin is a recognized founder of Slavic fantasy, to which The Three from the Forest and The Three Kingdoms belong, but he also worked in the genres of hard science fiction (The Megaworld), a political thriller (The Russians Are Coming series), social science fiction about the close-at-hand future (The Strange Novels), comic fantasy (The Teeth Open Wide series), and historical fantasy (The Prince’s Feast, Hyperborea series).

The Three from the Forest series is based on the life of the Neuri, which are, according to Nikitin, distant ancestors of the Eastern Slavs, as well as their neighbors, the Scythians and Cimmerians. It features three protagonists: Targitai, whose prototype is a legendary Scythian king of the same name, Oleg, identified with the historical personality of Slavic Prince Oleg, and Mrak, a strongman and werewolf. They go through various adventures in varied settings: the half-mythological lands of Hyperborea and Scythia, then Kievan Rus’, medieval Europe, and the Middle East. The last novels are set in Russia in the late 1990s (Tower 2), in outer space (Beyondhuman), and on alien planets (The Man of Axe). Four books, from The Holy Grail to The Return of Sir Thomas, form a separate sub-series telling the story of a heroic quest by Oleg and Sir Thomas, a knight crusader. As of June 2014, the series has 19 books, and six more are planned.

In 1999, Nikitin wrote the novel Pharamond, dedicated to the life and adventures of the semi-legendary progenitor of the Frankish kings from the Merovingian dynasty in the era of the Migration Period.

The Strange Novels series falls into social, psychological, and philosophical science fiction genres. The books speculate about the nearest future of Russia and the world. Most attention is given to the problems of personal and social development in the fast-changing hi-tech environment, to the changes that might occur in our present-day morals and culture under the impact of the new technologies, such as transhumanism, changing public morality, a person's place in the future, the possibility and prospects of immortality, and information wars. Nikitin was generally optimistic about the future. In his books, the strong-willed, hard-working, honest, and responsible are likely to become winners.

Nikitin also wrote the autobiographical books I'm 65 and I'm 75 and the textbook How to Become a Writer.

Nikitin avoided using the semicolon, considering it "a relic of the century before last".

Historian Victor Schnirelmann characterizes Nikitin as a former dissident of Russian nationalist orientation. Nikitin's books reproduce the ideas of Slavic neopaganism in artistic form and have become part of the neopagan subculture. According to Andrey Beskov, Nikitin prefers when the sources provide a minimum of information without limiting the author's imagination, so, for example, he builds myths about Slavic deities in the novel Artania.

In his works in the early 1990s, Nikitin depicts the Russians as descendants of the Scythians, who, according to him, settled widely from Western Asia to Western Europe and passed on their cultural achievements and gods to the local peoples. The Phoenicians are called "the purest Rus", who created the oldest written language in the world. The Canaanites are also identified with the Russian tribes, and the Levant is shown as primordially Russian territory.

The works show that the Russian pagan spiritual heritage, in all respects, surpasses the poor Western and Christian moral values. Russian paganism is the foundation of all later religions, including world ones, that arose. Depicting Slavic paganism, Nikitin borrowed various elements from the Old Testament and Christianity. In his representation of paganism, Nikitin approaches the position of the newspaper Native Spaces, portraying it as atheism. One of the characters, Oleg, says: "My god is reason, knowledge ... My world is without gods at all."

Nikitin wrote about the "Judeo-Masonic conspiracy", which goes back to the beginning of time and aims to establish the power of the chosen Wise Men worldwide. The Jewish god is depicted as thirsting for bloody human sacrifices and striving to destroy the Slavs, and the Jews sacrifice the Slavs to him. There is a world struggle between the forces of light and the forces of darkness, represented by the Slavs and the Jews, respectively.

Christianity destroyed the original faith of the ancestors, its volkhvs, and ancient Slavic writing. Nikitin repeats the neopagan mythology that Prince Vladimir the Great, fulfilling the order of the "Jewish Freemasons", entwined Rus' with a Christian net and turned the Russians into slaves. One of the heroes of the novels is Oleg the Prophet, a volkhv who remained faithful to paganism, despite the establishment of Christianity. Nikitin contrasts culture and civilization as higher and lower, connecting the first with noble paganism and the second with Satan and the "Jewish Masons". Oleg's main enemies are the "Jewish Masons", who serve the destructive idea of progress and civilization, and for whom the freedom-loving "uncontrollable" Slavic people are the greatest danger and, therefore, must disappear. At the same time, Christianity is portrayed as the younger brother of paganism, young and ignorant, and Oleg acts in alliance with the Christians.

Since the late 1990s, the interpretation of the past in Nikitin's works has changed somewhat. Nikitin softened his position on Jews and Christianity, and criticism of paganism often appears on the part of the heroes of the works. The identification of the Scythians and Slavs and the idea of the Scythian or Slavic affiliation of various characters and historical figures of ancient history (Achilles, Atilla, etc.) are preserved. Nikitin describes the Rus as the first people on earth and the "Aryan" ancestors. The "branch of the Rus" settled in Palestine and built the oldest local cities. The "genuine Russian" names of places in Palestine created by one of the founders of Russian neopaganism, Valery Yemelyanov, or derived from them are present, such as "Yeruslan" (Jerusalem) and "Siyan-mountain" (Mount Zion).

It is argued that Nazareth is the original "Slavic city", and therefore Jesus was a Slav. One of the landmarks in history for Nikitin was the Book of Veles, from which he borrowed ideas about the Slavs, such as their being the "grandchildren of Dazhdbog", their nomadic lifestyle in the endless steppes, and their ancient book culture. However, he refuses the idea of the Book of Veles that the ancient Slavs did not know human sacrifice.

Slavic paganism, according to Nikitin, teaches strength and courage, while Christianity teaches humility. At the same time, Nikitin writes that Christianity makes the world unified, "removes the walls between peoples", and begins to associate the problem of the Christianization of Rus' with the activities of the Byzantines, removing the question of the Jews. However, the stereotype is repeated that the Jews allegedly do not consider other people to be people and do not treat them morally because they are "goyim, subhuman".

The Jews are portrayed as the opposite of the "Scythian-Slavs"-Rus, endowing the former with negative qualities and the latter with positive ones. The Russians are a young people (which contradicts Nikitin's other thought about the origin of all the others from them) to whom the future belongs, while the Jews are an ancient people who stand on the edge of the grave. These two peoples are so different that they are doomed to eternal struggle. The ancient Jews seized Palestine by force and brutally destroyed the Rus-Canaanites, for which, according to ancient prophecy, they must be punished by the Rus and destroyed. Nevertheless, the author finds a way out of this situation in the decision that both peoples should merge into a single people.

Prince Vladimir forcibly baptizes the people of Kiev and turns the Russians into a "people of slaves." The departing volkhvs gradually introduce their rites and customs into the new faith. They go into the wilderness to prepare the people for a pagan revival in the distant future.

A peculiarity of The Strange Novels series is the absence of mainstay heroes. Except for The Imago and The Immortist, both featuring Bravlin Pechatnik, each novel tells a separate story. The books are only united by the common world and the scope of problems.

The four books of The Russians Are Coming series are commonly defined as alternate history, but they were political thrillers about the nearest future. The first novel, Rage, was written in 1994 and set in 1996. The protagonist is Platon Krechet, the President of Russia, determined to make his country strong and prosperous. In order to do it, he adopts Islam as the new state religion instead of Russian Orthodoxy. Such a theme was considered unacceptable at that time. No Russian publisher dared to release this novel, despite the unprecedented commercial success of The Three from the Forest several years before, so the first edition of Rage and its two sequels was printed and distributed by Nikitin at his own cost.

== Neologisms ==
Several words invented by Nikitin are now used in Russian language, especially on the web.

- Baim (Russian: байма) – a computer game, especially a MMOG. First used in The Baimer, this term subsequently appears in many other “strange novels” and also in The Reply (Baimer), a collection of short stories by Sergey Sadov. Nikitin explained his reasons to invent this word as the necessity to give the robustly developing industry of computer games its own name, like the term “cinematography” was introduced to replace the old-fashioned “motion picture photography.”
- Einastia (Russian: эйнастия) – a philosophical (or maybe religious) doctrine developed by Oleg, the protagonist in The Three from the Forest series. Einastia is mentioned in several books of the series but its essence is never described and hence remains an issue of debate among Nikitin's fans. The author prefers not to answer direct questions about the meaning of this word.
- Usians (Russian: юсовцы, derived from the USA) – a pejorative term used by some characters in The Strange Novels series to denote a sort of people, particularly (but not necessarily) in the present-day USA, who have a range of distinctive negative features, including:
1. Adherence to “universal values”, often understood primitively;
2. Devil-may-care attitudes towards other people;
3. Following a set of principles like “self comes first,” “don't be a hero” etc.

== Personal life ==
Nikitin had two children of his first marriage, which ended with his wife's death. In 1990, he met Lilia Shishikina, an experienced bookseller, and she became his business companion and common-law wife. For several years she was in charge of "Ravlik".

On 22 May 2010, Nikitin married Lilia during a small ceremony at their home in Red Eagles (Russian: Красные Орлы), a cottage settlement near Moscow. Only their closest friends were invited.

For over 30 years, Nikitin gave not a single interview, visited no conference or SF convention, and held no meeting with readers. This situation only changed after the release of Transhuman.

As of June 2014, Yuri Nikitin is a frequent visitor to the online forum Transhuman (Russian: Трансчеловек) where he has the nickname of Frog, being one of the first registered members and an honorary administrator. This website is the main platform of Nikitin's online communication with fans and readers as he had a skeptical attitude towards blogging. Also, there are online clubs of Nikitin's fans in Facebook and VK.

Nikitin and his wife lived in Falcon Hill (Russian: Соколиная гора), a cottage settlement near Moscow. They have a pet boxer Linda. As noted by fans, Nikitin lent his passion for strong sweet black coffee to nearly all his heroes. Nikitin preferred a healthy way of life: for many years, he drank no alcohol and practiced cycling and weightlifting as a hobby.

Nikitin died on 23 May 2025, at the age of 85.

== Bibliography ==
=== The Three from the Forest series ===
- In the Very Beginning (2008) (Russian: Начало всех начал)
- The Three from the Forest (1992) (Russian: Трое из леса)
- The Three in the Sands (1993) (Russian: Трое в песках)
- The Three and the Gods (1994) (Russian: Трое и боги)
- The Three in the Valley (1997) (Russian: Трое в долине)
- Mrak (1996) (Russian: Мрак)
- A Respite in Barbus (2004) (Russian: Передышка в Барбусе)
- The Secret Seven (1998) (Russian: Семеро тайных)
- The Outcast (2000) (Russian: Изгой)
- The Destroyer of Magic (2010) (Russian: Истребивший магию)
- Faramund (1999) (Russian: Фарамунд)
- The Hyperborean (1995) (Russian: Гиперборей)
- The Holy Grail/The Grail of Sir Thomas (1994) (Russian: Святой грааль)
- The Stonehenge/The Secret of Stonehenge (1994) (Russian: Стоунхендж)
- The Revelation (1996) (Russian: Откровение)
- The Return of Sir Thomas (2006) (Russian: Возвращение Томаса)
- Tower 2 (1999) (Russian: Башня-2)
- The Man of Axe (2003) (Russian: Человек с топором)
- Beyondhuman (2003) (Russian: Зачеловек)

=== The Richard Longarms series (as Gaius Julius Orlovsky) ===
- Richard Longarms 1: Stranger (2001) (Russian: Ричард Длинные Руки)
- Richard Longarms 2: Warrior of God (2001) (Russian: Ричард Длинные Руки - воин Господа)
- Richard Longarms 3: Paladin of God (2002) (Russian: Ричард Длинные Руки - паладин Господа)
- Richard Longarms 4: Seignior (2003) (Russian: Ричард Длинные Руки - сеньор)
- Richard Longarms 5: Richard de Amalphie (2004) (Russian: Ричард де Амальфи)
- Richard Longarms 6: Lord of Three Castles (2004) (Russian: Ричард Длинные Руки - властелин трех замков)
- Richard Longarms 7: Viscount (2005) (Russian: Ричард Длинные Руки - виконт)
- Richard Longarms 8: Baron (2005) (Russian: Ричард Длинные Руки - барон)
- Richard Longarms 9: Jarl (2005) (Russian: Ричард Длинные Руки - ярл)
- Richard Longarms 10: Earl (2005) (Russian: Ричард Длинные Руки - граф)
- Richard Longarms 11: Burggraf (2006) (Russian: Ричард Длинные Руки - бургграф)
- Richard Longarms 12: Landlord (2006) (Russian: Ричард Длинные Руки - лендлорд)
- Richard Longarms 13: Pfaltzgraf (2007) (Russian: Ричард Длинные Руки - пфальцграф)
- Richard Longarms 14: Overlord (2007) (Russian: Ричард Длинные Руки - оверлорд)
- Richard Longarms 15: Constable (2007) (Russian: Ричард Длинные Руки - коннетабль)
- Richard Longarms 16: Marquis (2008) (Russian: Ричард Длинные Руки - маркиз)
- Richard Longarms 17: Grossgraf (2008) (Russian: Ричард Длинные Руки - гроссграф)
- Richard Longarms 18: Lord Protector (2008) (Russian: Ричард Длинные Руки - лорд-протектор)
- Richard Longarms 19: Majordom (2008) (Russian: Ричард Длинные Руки - майордом)
- Richard Longarms 20: Markgraf (2009) (Russian: Ричард Длинные Руки - маркграф)
- Richard Longarms 21: Gaugraf (2009) (Russian: Ричард Длинные Руки - гауграф)
- Richard Longarms 22: Freigraf (2009) (Russian: Ричард Длинные Руки - фрайграф)
- Richard Longarms 23: Wieldgraf (2009) (Russian: Ричард Длинные Руки - вильдграф)
- Richard Longarms 24: Raugraf (2010) (Russian: Ричард Длинные Руки - рауграф)
- Richard Longarms 25: Konung (2010) (Russian: Ричард Длинные Руки - конунг)
- Richard Longarms 26: Duke (2010) (Russian: Ричард Длинные Руки - герцог)
- Richard Longarms 27: Archduke (2010) (Russian: Ричард Длинные Руки - эрцгерцог)
- Richard Longarms 28: Furst (2011) (Russian: Ричард Длинные Руки - фюрст)
- Richard Longarms 29: Kurfurst (2011) (Russian: Ричард Длинные Руки - курфюрст)
- Richard Longarms 30: Grossfurst (2011) (Russian: Ричард Длинные Руки - гроссфюрст)
- Richard Longarms 31: Landesfurst (2011) (Russian: Ричард Длинные Руки - ландесфюрст)
- Richard Longarms 32: Grand (2011) (Russian: Ричард Длинные Руки - гранд)
- Richard Longarms 33: Grand Duke (2012) (Russian: Ричард Длинные Руки - князь)
- Richard Longarms 34: Archfurst (2012) (Russian: Ричард Длинные Руки - эрцфюрст)
- Richard Longarms 35: Reichsfurst (2012) (Russian: Ричард Длинные Руки - рейхсфюрст)
- Richard Longarms 36: Prince (2012) (Russian: Ричард Длинные Руки - принц)
- Richard Longarms 37: Prince Consort (2012) (Russian: Ричард Длинные Руки - принц-консорт)
- Richard Longarms 38: Vice-Prince (2012) (Russian: Ричард Длинные Руки - вице-принц)
- Richard Longarms 39: Archprince (2012) (Russian: Ричард Длинные Руки - эрцпринц)
- Richard Longarms 40: Kurprince (2013) (Russian: Ричард Длинные Руки - курпринц)
- Richard Longarms 41: Erbprince (2013) (Russian: Ричард Длинные Руки - эрбпринц)
- Richard Longarms 42: Crown Prince (2013) (Russian: Ричард Длинные Руки - принц короны)
- Richard Longarms 43: Grand Prince (2013) (Russian: Ричард Длинные Руки - грандпринц)
- Richard Longarms 44: Prince Regent (2013) (Russian: Ричард Длинные Руки - принц-регент)
- Richard Longarms 45: King (2013) (Russian: Ричард Длинные Руки - король)
- Richard Longarms 46: King Consort (2013) (Russian: Ричард Длинные Руки - король-консорт)
- Richard Longarms 47: Monarch (2014) (Russian: Ричард Длинные Руки - монарх)
- Richard Longarms 48: Stadtholder (2014) (Russian: Ричард Длинные Руки - штатгалтер)
- Richard Longarms 49: Prince of the Emperor's Mantle (2014) (Russian: Ричард Длинные Руки - принц императорской мантии)
- Richard Longarms 50: Emperor (2014) (Russian: Ричард Длинные руки — император)
- Richard Longarms 51: Lord of the Crimson Star of Evil (2017) (Russian: Ричард Длинные руки — Властелин Багровой Звезды Зла)
- Richard Longarms 52: Richard and the Great Mages (2018) (Russian: Ричард Длинные руки — Ричард и Великие маги)
- Richard Longarms 53: Richard Longarms Trapped (2018) (Russian: Ричард Длинные руки в западне)

=== The Prince's Feast series ===
- The Prince's Feast (1997) (Russian: Княжеский пир)
- The Final Fight (1999) (Russian: Главный бой)

=== Hyperborea series ===
- Prince Rus (1996) (Russian: Князь Рус)
- Ingvar and Olha (1995) (Russian: Ингвар и Ольха)
- Prince Vladimir (1995) (Russian: Князь Владимир)

=== Teeth Open Wide series ===
- Teeth Wide Open (1998) (Russian: Зубы настежь)
- Ears Up In Tubes (2003) (Russian: Уши в трубочку)
- The Three-Handed Sword (2003) (Russian: Трехручный меч)

=== The Three Kingdoms series ===
- Artania (2002) (Russian: Артания)
- Pridon (2002) (Russian: Придон)
- Kuyavia (2003) (Russian: Куявия)
- Jutland, Brother of Pridon (2011) (Russian: Ютланд, брат Придона)
- Jutland and Melizenda (2018) (Russian: Ютланд и Мелизенда)

=== The Megaworld series ===
- Megaworld (1991) (Russian: Мегамир)
- The Lords of Megaworld (2000) (Russian: Владыки мегамира)

=== The Ballads of Great Knights ===
- Lohengrin, the Swan Knight (2012) (Russian: Лоэнгрин, рыцарь Лебедя)
- Tannhauser (2012) (Russian: Тангейзер)

=== The Strange Novels ===
- I Live in This Body (1999) (Russian: Я живу в этом теле)
- Scythians (2000) (Russian: Скифы)
- The Baimer (2001) (Russian: Баймер)
- The Imago (2002) (Russian: Имаго)
- The Immortist (2003) (Russian: Имортист)
- The Sorcerer of Agudy Starship (2003) (Russian: Чародей звездолета "Агуди")
- The Great Mage (2004) (Russian: Великий маг)
- Our Land is Great and Plentiful (2004) (Russian: Земля наша велика и обильна...)
- The Last Stronghold (2006) (Russian: Последняя крепость)
- Passing Through Walls (2006) (Russian: Проходящий сквозь стены)
- Transhuman (2006) (Russian: Трансчеловек)
- Worldmakers (2007) (Russian: Творцы миров)
- I Am a Singular (2007) (Russian: Я - сингуляр)
- Singomakers (2008) (Russian: Сингомэйкеры)
- 2024 (2009) (Russian: 2024-й)
- Guy Gisborn, a Knight Valiant (2011) (Russian: О благородном рыцаре Гае Гисборне)
- Dawnpeople (2011) (Russian: Рассветники)
- The Nasts (2013) (Russian: Насты)
- Alouette, little Alouette... (2014)

=== The Controller series ===
- On the Threshold (2016) (Russian: На пороге)
- A Skeleton in the Closet (2016) (Russian: Скелет в шкафу)
- The Birth of the Controller (2016) (Russian: Рождение Контролёра)
- A Man from the Future (2016) (Russian: Человек из будущего)
- Brigantines Raising Their Sails (2017) (Russian: Бригантины поднимают паруса)

=== The Russians Are Coming series ===
See "The Russians are coming" for the origin of the series name (Русские идут)

- Rage (1997) (Russian: Ярость)
- The Empire of Evil (1998) (Russian: Империя зла)
- On the Dark Side (1999) (Russian: На темной стороне )
- The Horn of Jericho (2000) (Russian: Труба Иерихона)

=== Timelord series (as Gaius Julius Orlovsky) ===
- Eugene the Timelord 1: The World of Three Moons (2015) (Russian: Юджин — повелитель времени. Книга 1. Мир Трёх Лун)
- Eugene the Timelord 2: The Tall Glerd (2015) (Russian: Юджин — повелитель времени. Книга 2. Высокий глерд)
- Eugene the Timelord 3: The Cartridges of the Wizard (2015) (Russian: Юджин — повелитель времени. Книга 3. Патроны чародея)
- Eugene the Timelord 4: All Women Are Chimeras (2015) (Russian: Юджин — повелитель времени. Книга 4. Все женщины — химеры (2015))
- Eugene the Timelord 5: Love Spells (2015) (Russian: Юджин — повелитель времени. Книга 5. Любовные чары)
- Eugene the Timelord 6: The Skyscrapers of the Mages (2015) (Russian: Юджин — повелитель времени. Книга 6. Небоскрёбы магов)
- Eugene the Timelord 7: Her Royal Highness (2015) (Russian: Юджин — повелитель времени. Книга 7. Её Высочество)
- Eugene the Timelord 8: The Kingdom of Gargalot (2015) (Russian: Юджин — повелитель времени. Книга 8. Королевство Гаргалот )
- Eugene the Timelord 9: The Victorious Torch of Gargalot (2016) (Russian: Юджин — повелитель времени. Книга 9. Победный «Факел Гаргалота»)

=== Golden Talisman series (as Gaius Julius Orlovsky; co-authored with a group of other writers) ===
- Worg: Run It Before Midnight (2017) (co-authored with Margo Gener) (Russian: Ворг. Успеть до полуночи)
- The Lost Girl (2017) (co-authored with Margo Gener) (Russian: Потерянная)
- Racing with Death (2017) (co-authored with Yuri Molchan) (Russian: Со смертью наперегонки)
- Willein the Smalling (2017) (co-authored with Paul Schmidt) (Russian: Мелкинд Виллейн)
- The Stronghold (2017) (co-authored with Margo Gener) (Russian: Цитадель)
- The Stronghold on Fire (2018) (co-authored with Margo Gener) (Russian: Цитадель в огне)
- The Sister of Wind (2018) (co-authored with Diana Hunt) (Russian: Сестра ветра)
- The Servant of the Reaper (2018) (co-authored with Margo Gener) (Russian: Слуга Жнеца)
- Striking Back (2018) (co-authored with Yuri Molchan) (Russian: Ответный удар)
- Steel Feathers (2018) (co-authored with Diana Hunt) (Russian: Стальные перья)

=== Other books ===
- Fire Worshippers (1976) (Russian: Огнепоклонники)
- The Golden Rapier (1979) (Russian: Золотая шпага)
- How to Become a Writer (2004) (Russian: Как стать писателем)
- I am 65 (2004) (Russian: Мне 65)
- I am 75 (2014) (Russian: Мне 75)

=== Collections ===
- The Man Who Changed the World (1973) (Russian: Человек, изменивший мир)
- The Radiant Far Palace (1985) (Russian: Далекий светлый терем)
- Singularity (2009) (Russian: Сингулярность)
- Singularity 2 (2012) (Russian: Сингулярность-2)

== Foreign releases ==
In the post-Soviet period, there were no official foreign releases of Nikitin's books. However, some of Nikitin's short stories can be found in English on the web, e. g. Sisyphus translated by David Schwab.

In 2013, a group of Nikitin's fans, with the author's consent, translated into English The Holy Grail (title changed to The Grail of Sir Thomas) and offered it as a free e-book on a range of online SFF forums.

As of June 2014, the English versions of three novels by Yury Nikitin (In the Very Beginning, The Grail of Sir Thomas, The Secret of Stonehenge) are available as e-books in major online retailers.
