= An Ancient Tale (novel) =

1876 novel by Józef Ignacy Kraszewski

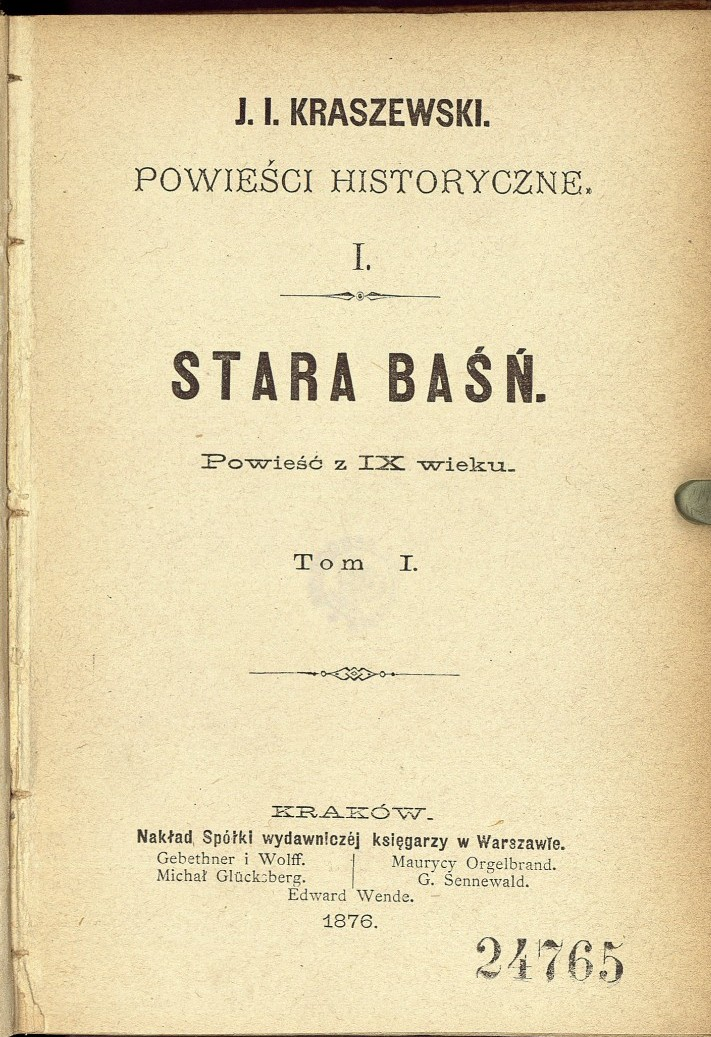
- An Ancient Tale by Kraszewski, 1876
- Author: Józef Ignacy Kraszewski
- Publisher: Gebethner i Wolff
- Publication date: 1876

An Ancient Tale. Novel of Polish history (Polish: Stara baśń. Powieść z dziejów Polski) is a historical novel by 19th-century Polish writer Józef Ignacy Kraszewski, published by Gebethner i Wolff (Gebethner & Wolff Publishers) in 1876 in Warsaw, then part of the Russian Empire. This work was the first novel in Kraszewski's long series of historical novels dealing with various periods in Poland's history. The second edition was published in 1879, in a lavishly illustrated form, with the plates done by then popular illustrator Michał Elwiro Andriolli. The manuscript of the novel was destroyed during World War II.

From May 2024, an autograph copy of the novel is presented at a permanent exhibition in the Palace of the Commonwealth in Warsaw.

== Contents ==
The content of the novel refers to old Polish stories and legends, including one about a cruel ruler prince, Popiel. He is one of the novel's main characters, though the author calls him "Chwostek". The story takes place during the dimly known times of pre-Christian Poland, in the lands of the pagan Polans tribe.

== Themes ==
The first theme of the novel is the political struggle between Chwostek, his wife Brunhilda and their court, as against the clans and free farmers. The Prince wants to introduce an absolute rule modeled on that of the Holy Roman Emperor, while his subjects want to preserve their freedoms. As the struggle intensifies, The Prince commits ever more cruel acts (mutilations, murders etc.), causing his subjects to openly rebel against his rule. Weaker in warriors and support, the Prince calls for help from his German allies and a civil war rages. Finally Chwostek and his allies are defeated, he and his family die during the siege of his keep, and the clans and free farmers elect a new ruler, Piast the Wheelwright.

The second theme of the novel, in addition to political, is the thread of love. Doman, a young but wealthy farmer and warrior, falls in love with beautiful Dziwa. She, however, believes that her calling is to serve the pagan gods, and therefore refuses to become his wife. Doman decides to do anything to win her love.

== Analysis ==
The novel is seen as one of the precursors for Slavic fantasy genre.

== Reception ==
The work has been called the most popular of Kraszewski's epic twenty-nine historical novels series covering the entire history of Poland. It is one of the most popular Polish novels by the number of editions; having received 78 editions in the period of 1944-2010.

== Adaptations ==
The novel has been a subject of many adaptions:

- In 1891 Alfred Szczepański published a drama in five parts based on the themes of Stara baśn titled Piast Pierwszy (Piast I) in Vienna, Austria,
- In 1900 Julian Baczyński published, in Chełmno, his book Królewna Hoża (Princess Buxom) inspired by the Kraszewski's novel.
- In 1907 Władysław Żeleński brought to the Lviv's stage his opera titled Stara baśń (An Ancient Tale) based on Kraszewski's work.
- In 2003 story was adapted for the screen by the film director Jerzy Hoffman as An Ancient Tale: When the Sun Was a God.

== See also ==
- external link for info on books by J.I. Kraszewski google books search (accessed on Aug.16. 2009)
- Biographical note and novel text in VIRTUAL LIBRARY OF POLISH LITERATURE
