= Romanów, Gmina Sosnówka =

Romanów
- Village
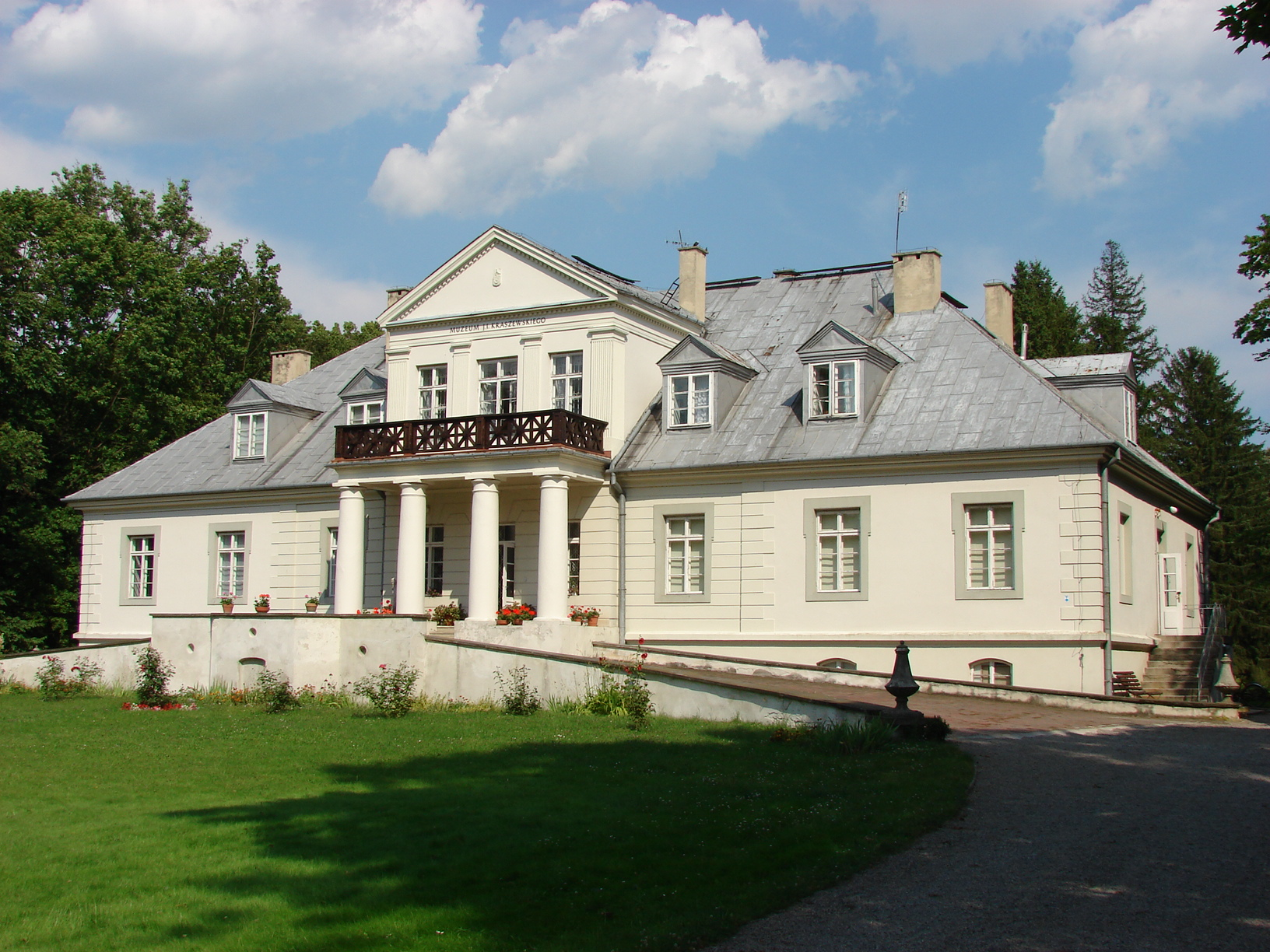
- Kraszewski Museum in Romanów

- Location within Poland
- Coordinates: 51°44′26″N 23°23′13″E
- Country: Poland
- Voivodeship: Lublin
- County: Biała
- Gmina: Sosnówka
- Time zone: UTC+1 (CET)
  - Summer (DST): UTC+2 (CEST)
- Vehicle registration: LBI

Romanów [rɔˈmanuf] is a village in the administrative district of Gmina Sosnówka, within Biała County, Lublin Voivodeship, in eastern Poland.

== History ==
Four Polish citizens were murdered by Nazi Germany in the village during World War II.

Since 1962, the Józef Ignacy Kraszewski Museum in Romanów is located here.

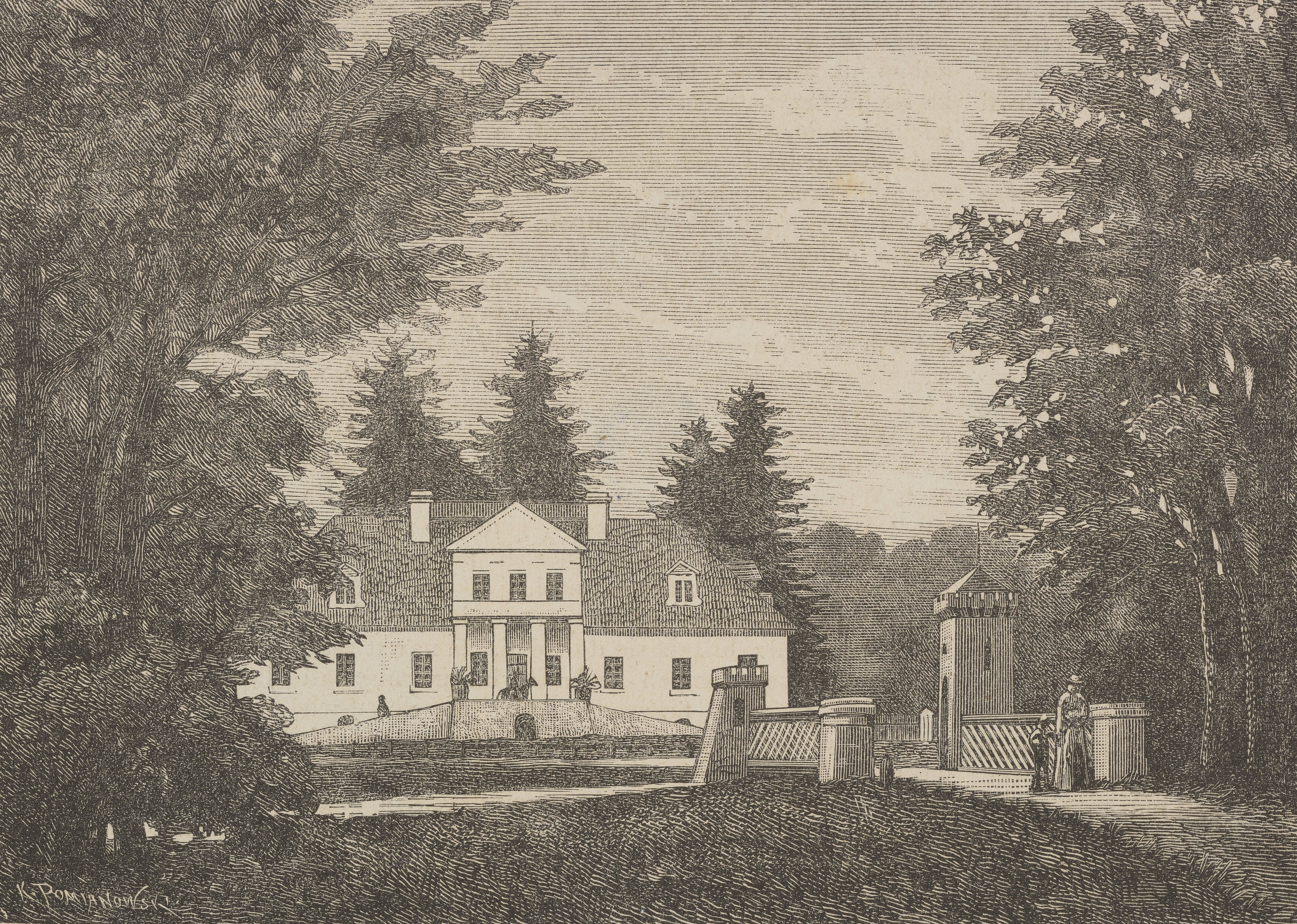
Manor house, before 1890
