= Sobociński =

Sobociński (feminine Sobocińska) is a Polish surname. Notable people with the surname include:

- Piotr Sobociński (1958–2001), Polish cinematographer, son of Witold Sobociński
- Maria Sobocińska (born 1994), Polish actress, daughter of Piotr Sobociński
- Remigiusz Sobociński (born 1974), Polish footballer
- Witold Sobociński (1929–2018), Polish cinematographer, father of Piotr Sobociński
- Jessika Sobocińska (born 2001), Polish rower
