= Agata Turkot =

Polish actress (born 1993)

- Born: 7 February 1993 (age 33); Warsaw, Poland
- Occupation: Actress
- Years active: 2016–present

Agata Turkot (born February 7, 1993) is a Polish actress. She received Polish Academy Award for Best Actress for her performance in the 2025 drama film Home Sweet Home.

== Life and career ==
Turkot was born inWarsaw, Poland and graduated from the Łódź Film School in 2018. She made her film debut appearing in Soyer (2017) and from 2018 to 2022 was regular cast member on the TVP1 soap opera, Leśniczówka. From 2019 to 2020 she also played main role in the Player crime drama series, Motive.

In 2021, Turkot starred in the drama film, The Wedding written and directed by Wojciech Smarzowski. In 2023 she appeared in the Canadian drama film Irena's Vow directed by Louise Archambault. In 2025, Turkot played the leading role in the social drama film Home Sweet Home directed by Wojciech Smarzowski. The role gained her the Polish Academy Award for Best Actress. The following year she had the leading role in the HBO Max period drama series, Women's Hell.

== Filmography ==
=== Film ===
Year	Title	Role	Notes
2017	Soyer	Anna Gawron	
2021	The Wedding	Lea	
2023	La Era Olvidada	Anastasia	
2023	Irena's Vow	Clara Bauer	
2023	The Taming of the Shrewd 2	Weronika	
2025	Pixie: The New Beginning	Hania's mother	
2025	Home Sweet Home	Goska	Polish Academy Award for Best Actress; Zbigniew Cybulski Award for Young Actor with an Outstanding Individuality; Warsaw Film Festival Special Award
2025	Notes of a Mortal	Receptionist	

=== Television ===
Year	Title	Role	Notes
2016	Na noze	Waitress	3 episodes
2018	Na dobre i na złe	Elka Wysocka	4 episodes
2020	Archiwista	Marika Stuchlik	Episode: "Na wieki moja"
2019-2020	Motyw	Young Anna Czarnecka 'Czarna'	10 episodes
2021	BrzydUla	Natalia Kotkowska	9 episodes
2018-2022	Leśniczówka	Pola Majewska	219 episodes
2023	Feedback	Ewa Orszanska	3 episodes
2026	Women's Hell	Helena Wróblewska	6 episodes
