= The Wedding (2021 film) =

- Original title: Wesele
- Directed by: Wojciech Smarzowski
- Written by: Wojciech Smarzowski
- Starring: Robert Więckiewicz; Agata Kulesza; Andrzej Chyra; Michalina Łabacz; Arkadiusz Jakubik; Mateusz Więcławek; Agata Turkot
- Cinematography: Piotr Sobociński Jr.
- Release date: 8 October 2021 (Poland)
- Running time: 135 min
- Country: Poland
- Language: Polish
- Box office: $ 2,315,496

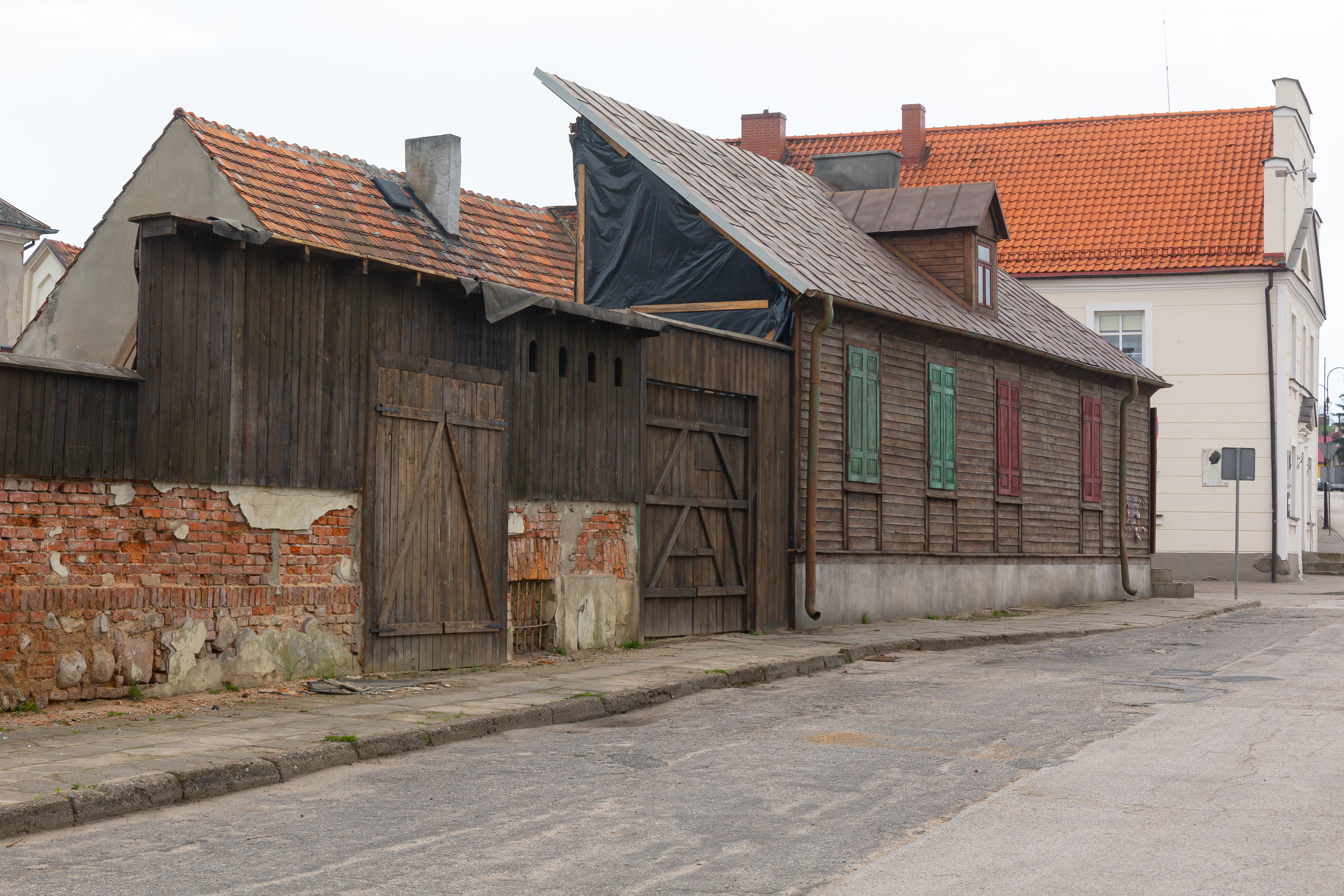
Nieszawa, Kuyavian-Pomeranian Voivodeship, Piekarska Street. Set design imitating wooden small-town architecture for the film "The Wedding" (2021), directed by Wojciech Smarzowski.

The Wedding (Polish: Wesele), also known as The Wedding Day and The Wedding Day 2, is a 2021 Polish drama film written and directed by Wojciech Smarzowski. The film tells complicated relationship between Polish and Jewish neighbours in Jedwabne. It stars Robert Więckiewicz, Agata Kulesza, Andrzej Chyra, Michalina Łabacz, Arkadiusz Jakubik, Mateusz Więcławek and Agata Turkot.

The Wedding premiered at the 2021 Tallinn Black Nights Film Festival winning Official Selection - Competition Award. At the 24th Polish Film Awards, film received ten nominations, including for Best Film, Best Director, Best Actor (Więckiewicz) and Best Supporting Actress (Kulesza), and won for Best Cinematography (Piotr Sobociński Jr.).

== Cast ==
- Robert Więckiewicz as Rysiek Wilk
- Agata Kulesza as Ela Wilk
- Michalina Łabacz as Kasia Wilk
- Przemysław Przestrzelski as Janek Sczuczyński
- Agata Turkot as Lea
- Arkadiusz Jakubik as Wodzirej / Wardoń
- Andrzej Chyra as Bogdan / Głowacki
- Maria Sobocińska as Inka
- Henryk Gołębiewski as Banaś / Furman
- Ryszard Ronczewski as Antoni Wilk
- Mateusz Więcławek as the young Antoni Wilk
- Robert Wabich as Zajdel
- Sebastian Stegmann as Hermann Schmidt

== Production ==
The Wedding is a follow-up to Smarzowski's 2004 film by the same name. Filming took place in Poland and Latvia between July and December 2020.

== Release ==
The Wedding was released on 8 October 2021. It performed well on its opening weekend, selling 139,536 tickets and per Film New Europe had the "best opening for a local production in 2021."

== Reception ==
In a praising critique of the film published by Kino Mania, Giuseppe Sedia noted that Smarzowski "invited to banquet on the big screen the same old sampler of vulgarians, bribable clerics and small town grandstanders. Subtleties aside, the Pieter Bruegel of Polish cinema offers once more a caricatural but clear-cut depiction of provincial Poland, dissolute, immobile and greedy as usual".

Screen Anarchy reviewed the film, writing "For the recurring didacticism and programmatic disruption of nationalistic self-image, The Wedding Day is an uncomfortable history revision delivered in a masterful and provocative high-wire act of genre, commercial and arthouse filmmaking of intense social relevance."
