= Jerzy Matuszkiewicz =

Polish jazz musician and composer (1928–2021)

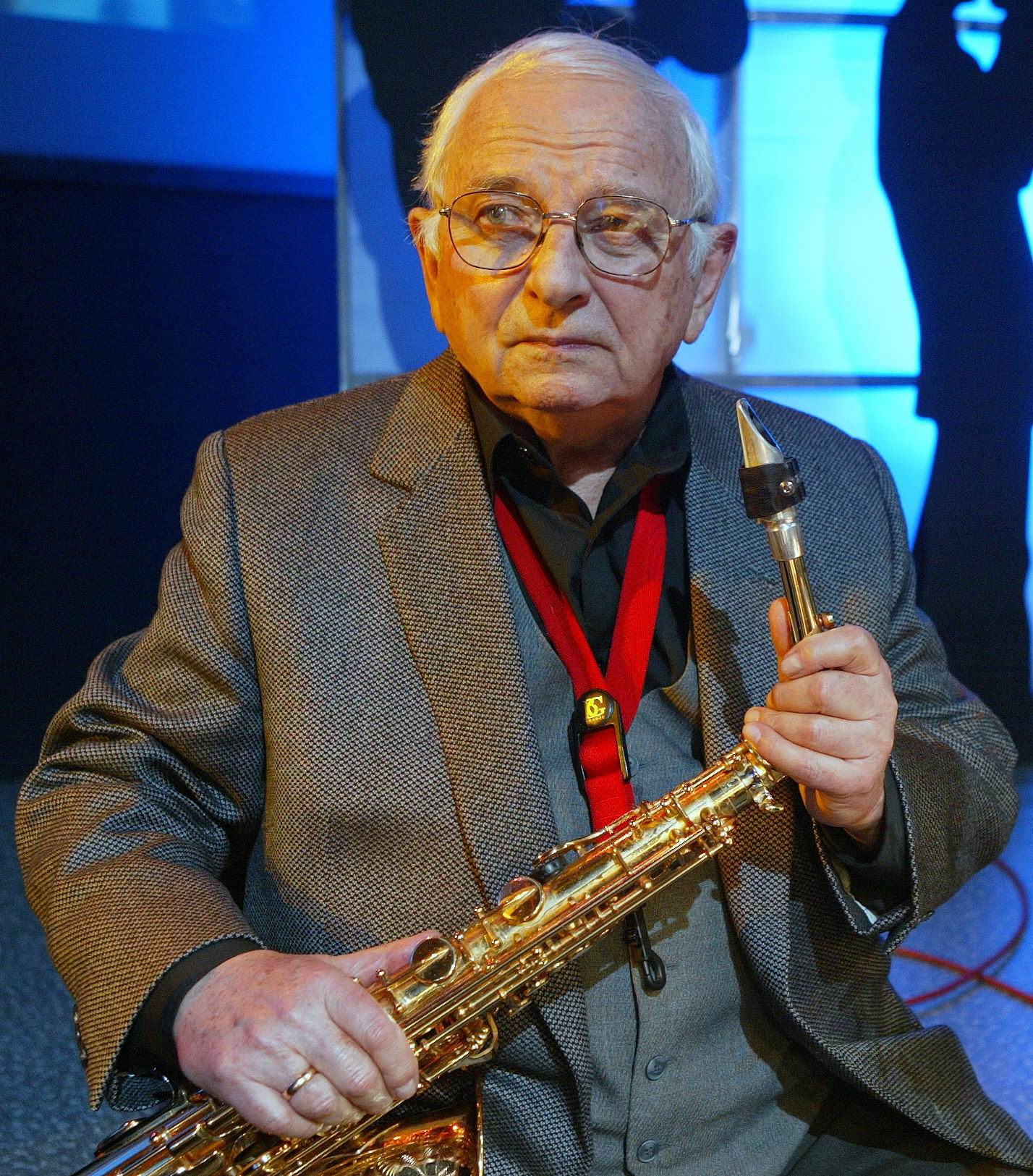
- Matuszkiewicz in 2006
- Born: 10 April 1928; Jasło, Poland
- Died: 31 July 2021 (aged 93); Warsaw, Poland
- Education: Łódź Film School
- Occupations: Jazz saxophonist; Jazz pianist; Film composer; Band leader
- Organizations: Melomani
- Awards: Order of Polonia Restituta; Polish Film Awards

Jerzy "Duduś" Matuszkiewicz (Polish pronunciation: [ˈjɛʐɨ matuʂˈkʲɛvit͡ʂ]; 10 April 1928 – 31 July 2021) was a Polish jazz musician and composer, playing saxophone, clarinet and piano. Between 1950 and 1958, he was leader of the jazz group Melomani. From 1965, he focused on composing music for films. He was a pioneer of the post-World War II jazz movement in Poland, regarded as a "Founding Father" of Polish jazz. He is best known for composing the music for the Polish TV series Janosik.

== Life and career ==
Matuszkiewicz was born in Jasło and began playing jazz as a youth. He founded a jazz club at the YMCA in Kraków at age 20, and played with the orchestra of Kazimierz Turewicz.

A club Melomani (music enthusiasts) was founded in 1947 at the Łódź YMCA, a hang-out of nonconformist thinkers during the late 1940s. Musicians of the first years included Marek Szczerbiński-Sart, trumpeter Andrzej "Idon" Wojciechowski, drummer Witold "Dentox" Sobociński, and Marian and Tadeusz Suchocki. Matuszkiewicz came to Łódź to study at the new Łódź Film School. He came to the club and joined the sessions. After only a few concerts, the YMCA was closed because the organisation was criticised for "debauching the youth and promoting imperialistic ideology using jazz music" at the end of the year.

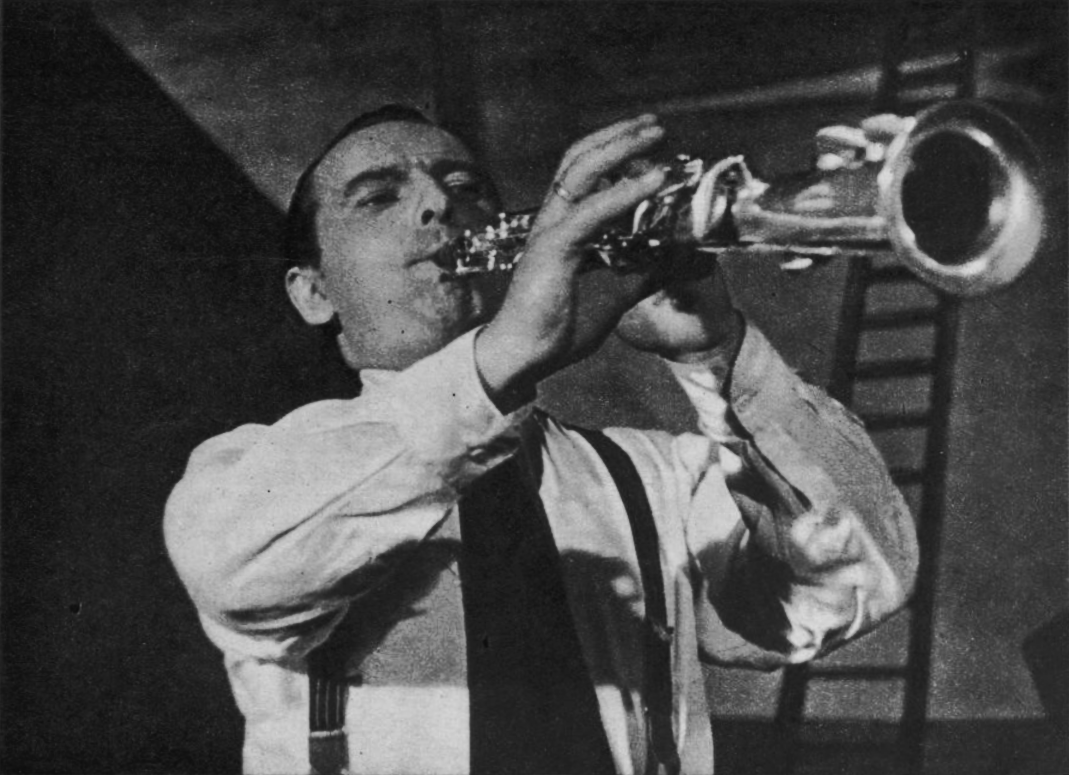
Duduś performing with Hot Club Melomani in 1957

Matuzkiewicz founded and led a band in 1950, playing saxophones and clarinet with the former players and additionally pianist Andrzej Trzaskowski and bassist Witold Kujawski. Polish musicians were separated from developments of Western jazz, because the Stalinist regime considered jazz music as part of decadent American culture. They had no recordings and publications, therefore they played a repertoire that did not compare to Western standards. Critic Elliott Simon noted:

Melomani played a series of standards with enthusiasm exceeded only by their fans' obvious adoration ... it is however, the historical circumstance - when Jazz was a high energy outlet for the creativity of a culturally repressed society."

The band was offered space to practise at the Film School, and during the first year, performed informal concerts at the Film School, in bars and afor private events, around once a week. When they received an invitation to play a concert in Warsaw at the Academy of Fine Arts, they named themselves Melomani. In 1952, pianist Krzysztof Komeda, who had connections and made more concerts beyond Łódź possible, joined the band. They played at the first jazz festival in Sopot in 1956. On 1 January 1958, they were the first Polish jazz band invited to perform at the National Philharmonic in Warsaw. The group disbanded that year.

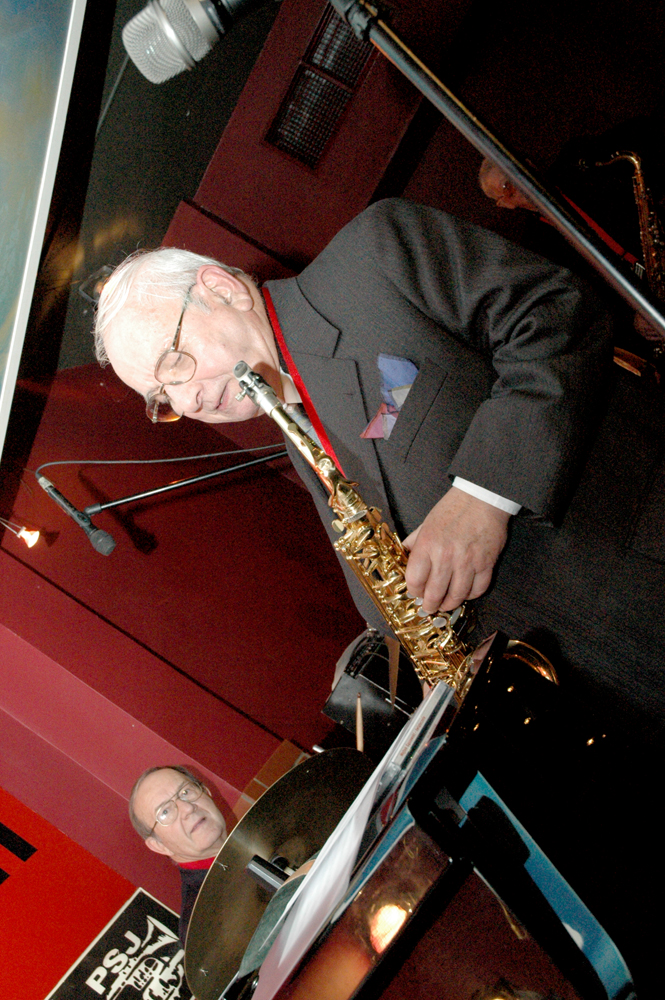
Matuszkiewicz performing at the jazz club Tygmont in 2006

Until 1964, Matuszkiewicz performed both in Poland and abroad. In 1965, he began to mainly compose and conduct music for movies and commercials. He later resided with his wife, Grażyna, in Warsaw, where he died, aged 93.

== Awards ==
Matuszkiewicz received the Commander's Cross of the Order of Polonia Restituta for outstanding achievements. In 2006, he was awarded the Gold Helikon medal from the Krakow Jazz Club. In 2021, he received an award for his life achievements at the Polish Film Awards gala.
