= Parabiosis (Homeland) =

- Homeland episode
- Episode no.: Season 5 Episode 6
- Directed by: Alex Graves
- Written by: Chip Johannessen; Ted Mann
- Production code: 5WAH06
- Original air date: November 8, 2015
- Running time: 46 minutes

Guest appearances
- Micah Hauptman as Mills; René Ifrah as Bibi; Jarreth Merz as Hajik Zayd; Morocco Omari as Conrad Fuller

Episode chronology
← Previous "Better Call Saul"	Next → "Oriole"
- Homeland season 5

"Parabiosis" is the sixth episode of the fifth season of the American television drama series Homeland, and the 54th episode overall. It premiered on Showtime on November 8, 2015.

== Plot ==
Carrie (Claire Danes) asks Saul (Mandy Patinkin) to fetch copies of the leaked CIA documents, voicing her theory that the Russians are trying to kill her due to something contained in the documents. Saul refuses to help her, but his suspicions are soon aroused when he notices that he is being followed by a surveillance detail. He learns from Allison (Miranda Otto) that Dar Adal (F. Murray Abraham) ordered the surveillance. During a heated argument, Adal accuses Saul of being in league with the Israelis, and proclaims that Saul will be subjected to a polygraph test.

Carrie returns to Jonas (Alexander Fehling) at their hideaway, who tells her that Quinn wandered off while severely bleeding and is probably dead. Jonas gives Carrie an ultimatum, telling her it is time to notify the authorities and to come home with him, but Carrie stays behind. With nowhere else to turn, she asks Otto Düring (Sebastian Koch) for access to a private airplane, explaining that she brings ruin to everyone around her and that she wants to simply disappear.

Quinn (Rupert Friend) is rehabilitated by Hussein, a doctor who resides with a group of Syrian jihadists. The leader of the group, Hajik (Jarreth Merz), is released from prison due to his prosecution being based on the CIA's illegal spying. Hajik suspects Quinn of being an American spy, but Quinn is able to convince the rest of the group that he is a mercenary. When Quinn is healthy enough to leave, he is attacked by Hajik. Quinn kills him in hand-to-hand combat.

Saul arrives at the station to find that most of his clearances have been revoked, and that he is locked out of the computer system. Saul sneaks onto Mills' computer to copy the leaked documents and then goes to a private club owned by Düring. He asks Düring to deliver the documents to Carrie. They are quickly accosted by CIA personnel. The CIA men find nothing after thoroughly searching Saul and Düring, and then take Saul away. When Düring stops at the coat check before leaving, he discovers that Saul had already left the documents in his coat pocket. Düring presents the documents to Carrie before she boards the airplane.

== Production ==
The episode was directed by Alex Graves and co-written by executive producer Chip Johannessen and co-executive producer Ted Mann.

== Reception ==
=== Reviews ===
With 9 positive reviews out of 12, the episode received a rating of 75% with an average score of 7.5 out of 10 on the review aggregator Rotten Tomatoes, with the site's consensus stating "'Parabiosis' makes a long-overdue effort to pull the various plots of season five together, even though Homeland is still taking too long to bring significant parts of its story into focus." Joshua Alston of The A.V. Club gave the episode a "B+" grade, praising Carrie's storyline for continuing to explore new ground for the series. However, Alston also expressed reservations about Quinn's storyline, calling it a "desperate ploy to keep the gutshot Quinn tethered to a story he doesn’t currently have a lot of utility in". IGN's Scott Collura rated the episode 8.5 out of 10, saying that "[Mandy] Patinkin’s restrained, tightly wound performance, as always, is one of the best aspects of this show" and citing the Saul/Dar Adal confrontation as a standout scene. Price Peterson of New York Magazine rated the episode 4 out of 5 stars, and wrote "'Parabiosis' worked well not only as an acceleration of the season's story, but as sheer moment-by-moment entertainment".

=== Ratings ===
The original broadcast was watched by 1.35 million viewers, an increase in viewership from the previous week of 1.30 million viewers.
