= Film New Europe =

Film New Europe may refer to one of two unrelated film organizations based in Warsaw, Poland

- Film New Europe Association, a networking body and information website
- New Europe Film Sales, a production company and distributor
