= Melomani =

Polish jazz group (1951–1958)

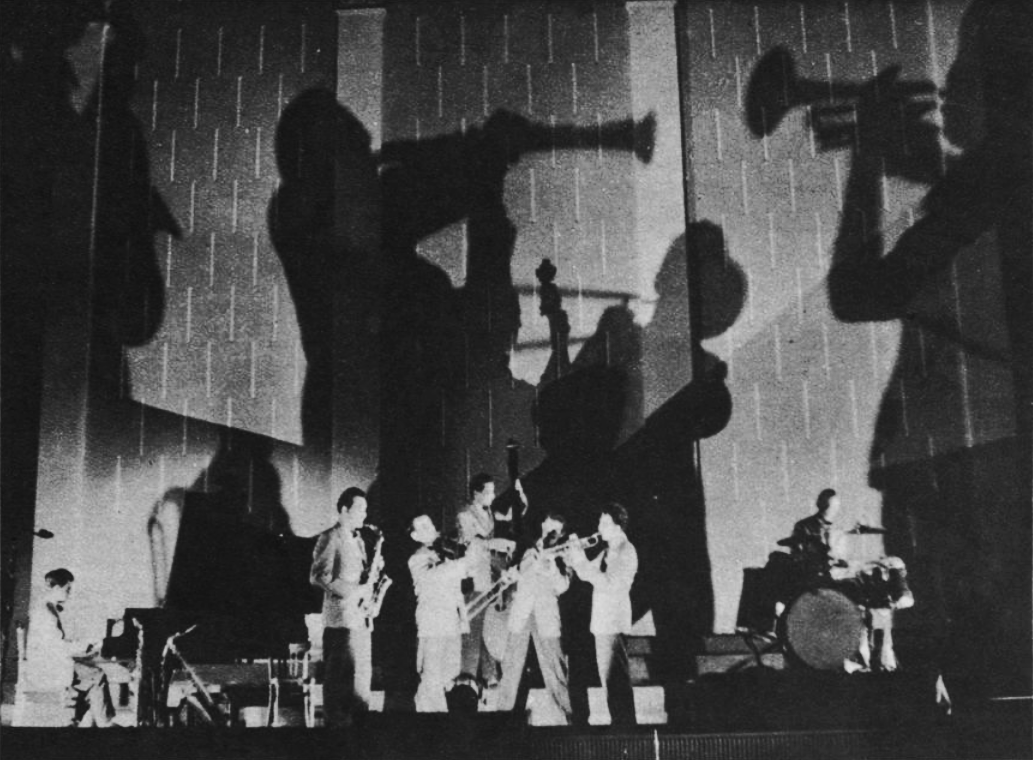
- Melomani in 1956. L–R: Trzaskowski, Thomys, Matuszkiewicz, Kujawski, Sobociński, Wojciechowski and Studziński

Background information
- Also known as: Melomani Jazz Group; Hot Club Melomani
- Origin: Łódź, Poland
- Genres: Dixieland; bebop; Polish jazz
- Years active: 1951–1958
- Label: Polskie Nagrania „Muza”
- Past members: Jerzy "Duduś" Matuszkiewicz; Andrzej Trzaskowski; Witold Sobociński; (see Personnel section for others)

The Melomani, later known as Hot Club Melomani, were a pioneer Polish jazz band. Formed in Łódź in 1951 by Jerzy Matuszkiewicz, they were the first self-styled Polish jazz musical group.

Founded during the period of Stalinism, when jazz music, regarded as a synonymous with the "reactionary American culture", was officially banned by the then communist authorities, Melomani were forced to conduct underground activities until 1955. By then, many musicians had contributed to the band, one of them being Krzysztof Komeda, whose concepts inspired the group at one point to split into two different line-ups operating under the same name – a traditional one (playing dixieland) and a modern one (playing bebop).

== History ==
Following the World War II, new, communist government of People's Republic of Poland banned jazz music, after the initial period of fascination and limited artistic freedom in 1946 and 1947. It was seen as part of the decadent, American culture and as such jazz was outlawed, together with modern art. This stance of the government was disliked among rebellious individuals and groups of the Polish youth (among them Leopold Tyrmand), who went underground to keep on playing thebanned music (hence, the period of late 1940s and early 1950s is called the catacombs).

According to saxophonist and composer Jerzy Matuszkiewicz, who was the founding member of the band, Melomani consisted of students of the famous National Film School in Łódź, such as Witold Sobociński and Andrzej Wojciechowski (Matuszkiewicz also studied there) as well as young men from other big cities like Kraków and Poznań, because in Łódź itself, there were not enough jazz-oriented musicians. Later on, Krzysztof Komeda, generally regarded as the best jazz player in Poland, also joined the band. Other members were Witold Kujawski, Andrzej Kurylewicz and Andrzej Trzaskowski, but the lineup fluctuated.

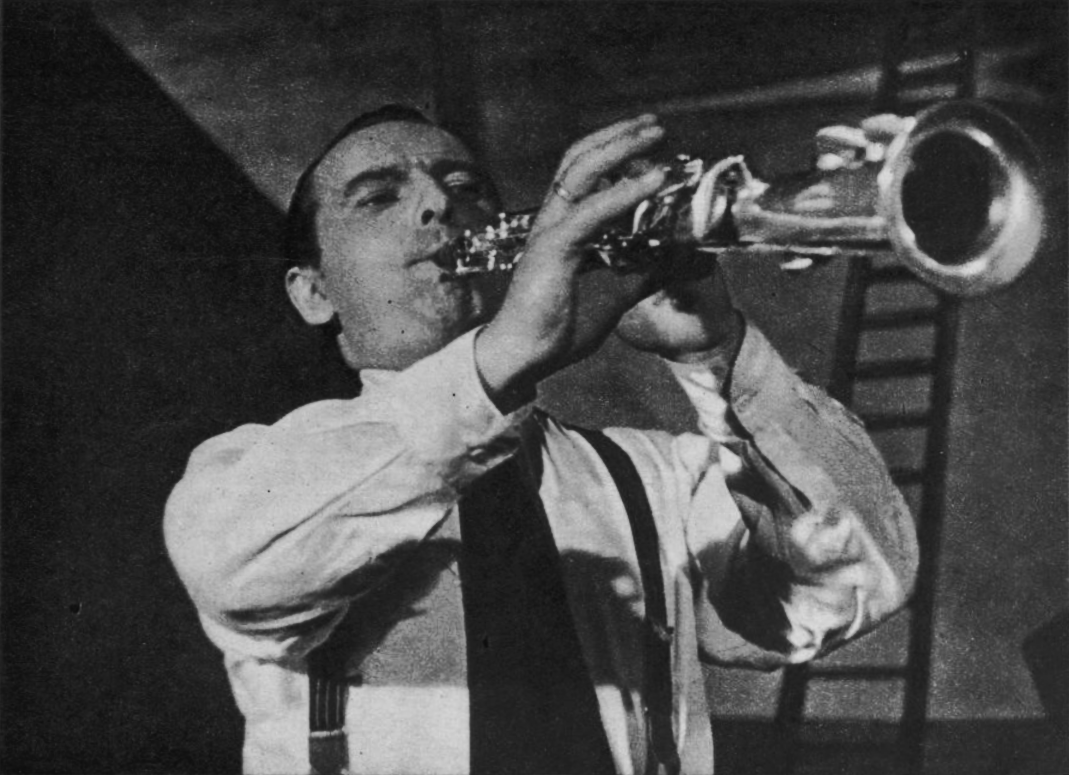
Melomani's leader Jerzy Matuszkiewicz performing with the group in Rozmowy jazzowe (1957)

Matuszkiewicz said in an interview given to Gazeta Wyborcza that even though playing jazz was illegal, officers of communist police, who controlled concerts, did not really know what jazz was. Usually, at the beginning of a concert, the officers were given a glass of vodka and did not care about the remaining part of the show. Given the circumstances (Polish musicians were separated from the West and Western jazz records were scarce), it is not surprising that the young enthusiasts were amateurs in comparison with American or even European musicians. The standard of performing jazz in Poland was low. However, this did not matter to the fans, as they embraced the band as the forbidden fruit. Melomani played the sort of music that they considered jazz, such as Jelly Roll Morton's and W. C. Handy's compositions.

Initially, Melomani played to a very limited audience, but starting since the mid-1950s, they expanded their base, and were invited to several festivals, such as legendary "Jam Session 1", which took place in Sopot in 1955, eventually becoming the most popular jazz group in Poland. Inspired by Krzysztof Komeda's concepts, Hot Club Melomani at one point split up into two different line-ups operating under the same name – a traditional one (playing dixieland) and a modern one (playing bebop).

The group existed until early 1958 when, following the so-called thaw of some rules of the system (see: Polish October), jazz triumphantly returned to main venues of the country, and was played even in concert halls, which had been unheard of before. The first jazz performance in a Polish concert hall took place on January 5, 1958 in Warsaw and featured Melomani, marking the closing chapter of the group's career. Soon afterwards the band dissolved, because, as Matuszkiewicz said, "it had fulfilled its task."

== Legacy ==
After the break-up Matuszkiewicz became a successful composer of soundtracks of several Polish movies, Sobociński went on to become a famous cinematographer, and other members of the ensemble created their own bands, such as the Andrzej Trzaskowski Quintet. The latter's son is a Civic Platform politician and the current city mayor of Warsaw – Rafał Trzaskowski.

Hot Club Melomani's impact on Polish culture also inspired Andrzej Wajda's Innocent Sorcerers (1960) as some of the film's characters names, like played by Roman Polanski "Dudek" Polo, are direct references to Melomani's real life members ("Duduś" Matuszkiewicz). The movie also features cameos from several ex-members of the group, such as Trzaskowski and Wojciechowski.

In 2019 the Jube Legends label released Melomani Jazz Group's recordings as part of its All That Jazz series as Volume 115: Jammin' in Warsaw.

On October 6, 2023 a documentary film Na zawsze Melomani (2023) directed by Rafał Mierzejewski was released.

== Personnel ==
Melomani

- Jerzy Matuszkiewicz – tenor saxophone, clarinet
- Andrzej Wojciechowski – trumpet
- Andrzej Trzaskowski – piano
- Krzysztof Komeda – piano
- Witold Kujawski – double bass
- Witold Sobociński – drums, trombone
- Antoni Studziński – drums

Hot Club Melomani (traditional)

- Jerzy Matuszkiewicz – soprano saxophone
- Lesław Lic – clarinet
- Włodzimierz Wasio – trombone
- Andrzej Kurylewicz – piano
- Roman Dyląg – double bass
- Witold Sobociński – drums

Hot Club Melomani (modern)

- Alojzy Thomys – alto saxophone
- Jerzy Tatarak – baritone saxophone
- Andrzej Trzaskowski – piano
- Roman Dyląg – double bass
- Witold Sobociński – drums

== Discography ==
- Festiwal Jazzowy (1956, live)
- Jazz By The Sea (1957, live)
- Hot Club Melomani / American Jazz Group (1957)
- Hot Club Melomani (1958, EP)
- Golden Era of the „Melomani” Group (1975, compilation)
- Melomani 1952–1957 (1999, compilation)

== Filmography ==
- Rozmowy jazzowe (1957)
- Ostrożność (1957)

== See also ==
- Polish jazz
- Music of Poland
