= Better Call Saul (Homeland) =

- Homeland episode
- Episode no.: Season 5 Episode 5
- Directed by: Michael Offer
- Written by: Benjamin Cavell; Alex Gansa
- Production code: 5WAH05
- Original air date: November 1, 2015
- Running time: 51 minutes

Guest appearances
- Nina Hoss as Astrid; Atheer Adel as Numan; Allan Corduner as Etai Luskin; Mark Ivanir as Ivan Krupin; Steve Nicolson as Boris

Episode chronology
← Previous "Why Is This Night Different?"	Next → "Parabiosis"
- Homeland season 5

"Better Call Saul" is the fifth episode of the fifth season of the American television drama series Homeland, and the 53rd episode overall. It premiered on Showtime on November 1, 2015.

== Plot ==
Astrid (Nina Hoss) identifies the man who tried to kill Quinn (Rupert Friend) as a freelancer for the SVR. When Carrie (Claire Danes) learns this, she surmises that Russia is trying to suppress what is contained in the leaked CIA documents, and tries to learn what information they contain. As Quinn recovers from the gunshot, Jonas (Alexander Fehling) comes to their hideout with medical supplies and watches over Quinn.

Confirming her alliance with Russia, Allison Carr (Miranda Otto) meets with Krupin (Mark Ivanir) to discuss their plans. Allison believes that Carrie has been killed after being shown the staged photo delivered by Quinn. Dar Adal (F. Murray Abraham) learns that the bomb from General Youssef's plane resembled ones used by Israel, leading him to wonder if Saul (Mandy Patinkin) and Etai (Allan Corduner) conspired the bombing. He orders Allison to initiate surveillance on Saul. Allison then manipulates Saul into suspecting Etai by showing him proof that Etai was in Geneva the day before the bombing. Saul goes to question Etai with CIA surveillance watching them.

Carrie learns from Laura Sutton (Sarah Sokolovic) that Numan (Atheer Adel) no longer has the CIA documents, and that they were sold to Russians. Laura suggests that the CIA itself is now the only avenue to retrieve the documents.

When Quinn's condition becomes dire, Jonas has no choice but to take him to the hospital. Quinn, fearing he will fall into enemy hands, sneaks away instead. Saul gets a message from Carrie and finds her in a car waiting for him outside. Quinn prepares to kill himself by jumping into the water with a cinder block tied to him. Before he does so, a passerby unties him and offers help, which Quinn refuses. With the passerby trailing him, Quinn stumbles around before eventually passing out.

== Production ==
The episode was directed by Michael Offer and co-written by showrunner Alex Gansa and co-executive producer Benjamin Cavell.

== Title ==
The episode title "Better Call Saul" refers to the necessity of Homeland character Carrie Mathison getting in touch with Saul Berenson and is also a reference to the Breaking Bad spin-off of the same name. Coincidentally, German actor Rainer Bock, who has a prominent role in season 4 of Better Call Saul, appears in this episode.

== Reception ==
=== Reviews ===
With 10 positive reviews out of 12, the episode received a rating of 83% with an average score of 7.1 out of 10 on the review aggregator Rotten Tomatoes, with the site's consensus stating "While 'Better Call Saul' contains its fair share of ridiculous moments, the end pays off with the reunion of Homeland's most important characters."

IGN's Scott Collura rated the episode 8.4 out of 10, giving recognition to the depth of the Allison Carr character, as well as Miranda Otto's portrayal. Aaron Riccio of Slant Magazine criticized the episode for being lacking in subtlety. Cynthia Littleton of Variety wrote that the episode was "nicely done all around" and praised the "great visual touches of film noir".

=== Ratings ===
The original broadcast was watched by 1.30 million viewers, a decrease in viewership from the previous week of 1.63 million viewers.
