= Hanna Mikuć =

Polish actress (born 1955)

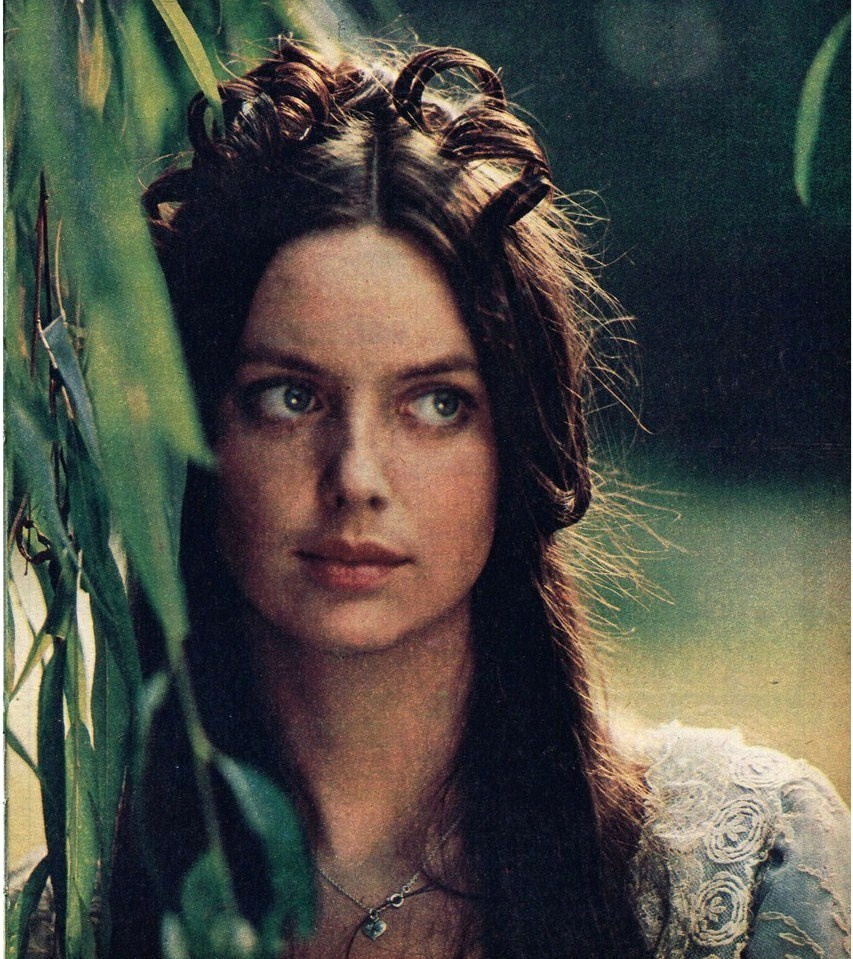
- Mikuć in Honor dziecka (1976)
- Born: 8 August 1955 (age 70); Łódź, Poland
- Education: Łódź Film School
- Occupation: Actress
- Years active: 1972–present
- Spouse: Piotr Sobociński (died 2001)
- Children: Piotr Sobociński Jr.; Michał Sobociński; Maria Sobocińska

Hanna Mikuć (Polish pronunciation: [ˈxan.na ˈmi.kut͡ɕ]; born 8 August 1955) is a Polish actress.

== Biography ==
Mikuć was born in Łódź to actors Bohdan Mikuć and Wanda Chwiałkowska. She studied acting at the Łódź Film School. Early in her career, she performed at the Ateneum Theatre, TR Warszawa, and the Teatr Dramatyczny.

She was married to cinematographer Piotr Sobociński until his death in 2001. They had met on the set of An Uneventful Story (1982). Their children, Piotr Jr., Michał, and Maria, were born in 1983, 1987, and 1994, respectively.

== Filmography ==
=== Film ===
Year	Title	Role	Notes	Ref.
1973	Hubal	Liaison officer		
1977	Gorączka mleka	Woman at funeral	Short film	
1979	Zmory	Balbina		
1981	Do krwi ostatniej	Soldier		
1982	Ryś	Pregnant girl		
1983	Pensja pani Latter	Madzia Brzeska		
1983	An Uneventful Story	Katarzyna		
1984	Przygody Błękitnego Rycerzyka	Ant	Voice role	
1984	Widziadło	Paulina		
1984	Sexmission	Linda		
1985	Woman in a Hat	Ewa		
1985	Write and Fight	Sixtus's lover		
1986	Spowiedź dziecięcia wieku	Brygida Pierson		
1986	Smak czekolady	Ewa		
1990	Eminent Domain	Nurse		
1991	Głuchy telefon	Katarzyna		
1997	Taranthriller	Joanna		
1998	Łóżko Wierszynina	Olga		
2001	Pieniądze to nie wszystko	Ms. Janinka		

=== Television ===
Year	Title	Role	Notes	Ref.
1976	Honor dziecka	Krysia Boratyńska	Television film	
1976	Daleko od szosy	Young woman	1 episode	
1982	Najdłuższa wojna nowoczesnej Europy	Magda Skorupko	1 episode	
2001–present	L for Love	Krystyna Filarska-Marszałek	244 episodes	
2004	Pensjonat pod Różą	Edyta Kopaczewska	1 episode	
2009	Na dobre i na złe	Lidia	1 episode	
2017	Father Matthew	Regina Walczak	1 episode	
