= Why Is This Night Different? =

- Homeland episode
- Episode no.: Season 5 Episode 4
- Directed by: John Coles
- Written by: Ron Nyswaner
- Production code: 5WAH04
- Original air date: October 25, 2015
- Running time: 49 minutes

Guest appearances
- Atheer Adel as Numan; Sven Schelker as Korzenik; Allan Corduner as Etai Luskin; Mark Ivanir as Ivan Krupin; Yigal Naor as General Youssef; Janina Blohm-Sievers as Sabine; Reymond Amsalem as Etai's wife; Darina El Joundi as Mrs. Youssef; Emily Cox as Claudia; Aylin Tezel as Amena

Episode chronology
← Previous "Super Powers"	Next → "Better Call Saul"
- Homeland season 5

"Why Is This Night Different?" is the fourth episode of the fifth season of the American television drama series Homeland, and the 52nd episode overall. It premiered on Showtime on October 25, 2015.

== Plot ==
Allison Carr (Miranda Otto) and Saul Berenson (Mandy Patinkin) are guests at a Jewish Passover Seder at the home of Etai Luskin (Allan Corduner). Etai compares the slavery of the Jews in ancient Egypt with the treatment of the Jews in the Second World War in Germany.

Peter Quinn (Rupert Friend) tells Carrie Mathison (Claire Danes) that he was given an order by Saul to kill her. They stage a scene and take photos to fake Carrie's death, and Carrie prepares to go into hiding. Before she does, Carrie insists on scouting the post office where Quinn gets his assignments in order to confirm whether it really was Saul who wanted her killed. After Quinn drops off his "proof" of Carrie's death in the post office box, a hitman arrives, targeting Quinn, and a gunfight ensues. Quinn is shot but survives, and the hitman is killed. Carrie takes the hitman's phone.

Allison and Saul oversee an operation in which General Youssef of Syria (Yigal Naor) is lured to a bogus clinic in Switzerland where Youssef seeks a kidney transplant for his daughter. Allison and Saul eventually reveal themselves, warning Youssef that he could be arrested on the spot for war crimes, and attempt to persuade him to be their chosen new president of Syria after their planned coup to overthrow current president Bashar al-Assad.

Korzenik (Sven Schelker) goes to a meeting, expecting to sell the CIA documents to the diplomat he made arrangements with, but instead is greeted by Krupin (Mark Ivanir), a Russian SVR agent. Krupin has Korzenik beaten until he gives up the location of the extra copies he made of the documents. Korzenik, along with his girlfriend back at their apartment, are then both killed. Numan (Atheer Adel) later happens upon her body.

General Youssef boards a plane to return to Syria, with Allison and Saul seeing him off. Carrie dials the one contact number she finds in the hitman's phone. Allison answers the call, asking in Russian "yes?" The plane carrying General Youssef explodes seconds later.

== Production ==
The episode was directed by John Coles, with his first directing credit for the series, and written by co-executive producer Ron Nyswaner, with his first writing credit for the series after joining the writing staff this season.

== Reception ==
=== Reviews ===
With 11 positive reviews out of 12, the episode received a rating of 92% with an average score of 8.9 out of 10 on the review aggregator Rotten Tomatoes, with the site's consensus stating "'Why Is This Night Different?' finds various strands of Homeland's intriguing season five plot snapping into place amidst an intense, satisfying installment."

Price Peterson of New York Magazine rated the episode 5 out of 5 stars, saying it "surprised and delighted as much as any mid-season episode could", and that Carrie and Quinn's relationship "has never been more compelling".

Joshua Alston of The A.V. Club graded the episode "A−", stating that Carrie and Quinn being on screen together elevates the series, and praised the performances of both Claire Danes and Rupert Friend, saying of Danes "scenes like the recording of the video serve as a potent reminder of why Danes has been so widely celebrated for her performance".

Cynthia Littleton of Variety gave a positive review, calling the storyline involving the CIA and General Youssef "remarkable for its discussion of real-world leaders, real-world terrorists... and real-world politics".

=== Ratings ===
The original broadcast was watched by 1.63 million viewers, an increase in viewership from the previous week of 1.11 million viewers.
