= Wojciech Kasperski =

Polish screenwriter, film director and producer

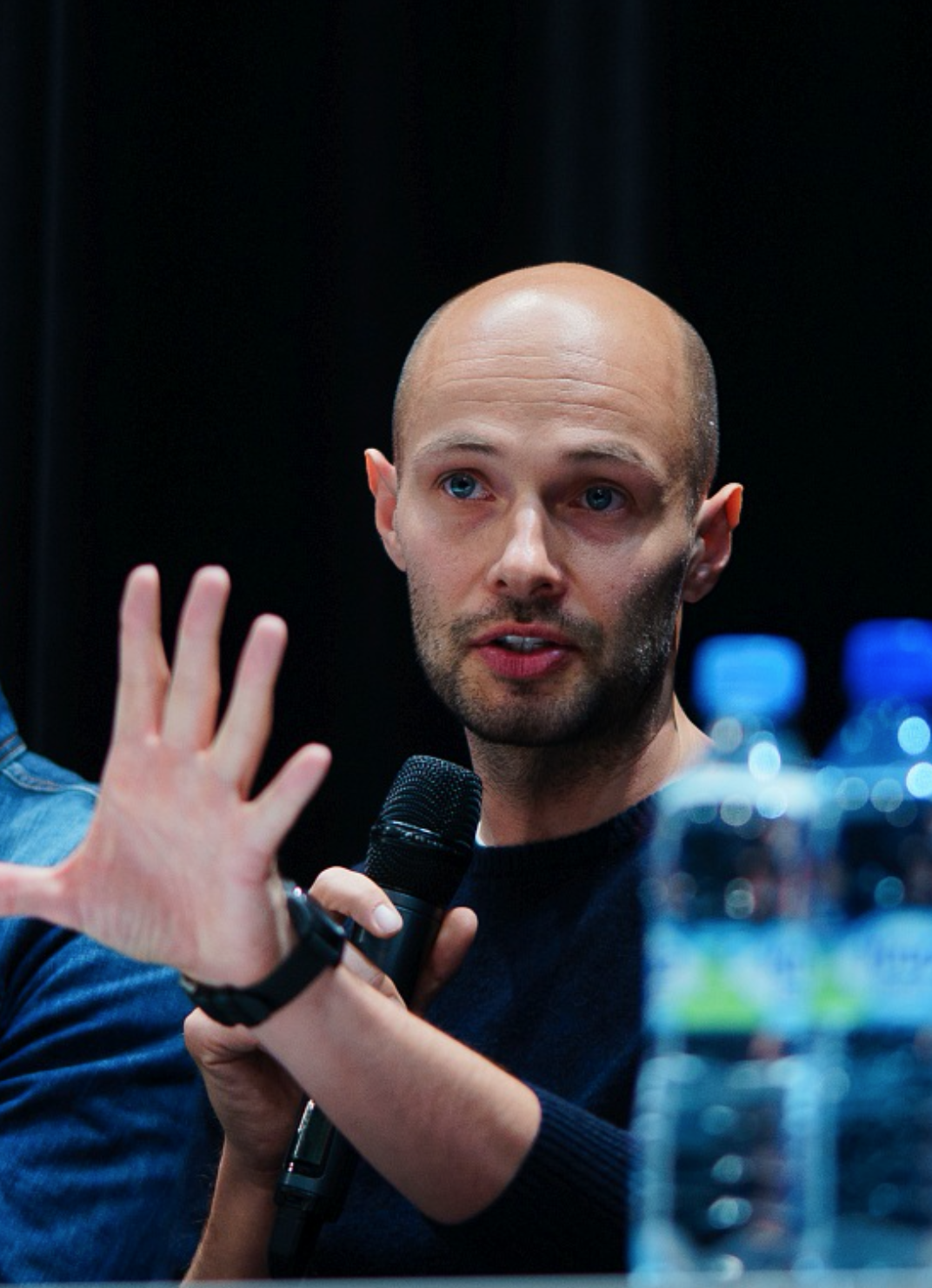
- Kasperski at Gdynia Film Festival, 2016
- Born: April 25, 1981 (age 45); Kartuzy, Pomerania, Poland
- Education: Polish National Film School, University of Gdańsk
- Occupations: screenwriter, film director, producer
- Years active: 2006 – present
- Notable work: The Seeds, The Refuge City

Wojciech Kasperski (born April 25, 1981) is a Polish screenwriter, film director and producer. In 2006 he received the Grand Prix for The Seeds for Best Documentary at Kraków Film Festival, and went on to win several prestigious awards including Sterling Short Grand Jury Award at AFI-Discovery Channel Silverdocs Documentary Festival. His short films won over forty awards and recognitions around the world and garnered extensive media attention and critical acclaim. Winner of Golden Laurel, Russian Film Academy Award for Best Short Documentary.

== Biography ==
He was born in Kartuzy and moved with his family to Sopot a seaside town on the coast of the Baltic Sea. In 2001–2002, he studied philosophy at the University of Gdańsk, but subsequently gave it up, and studied at the National Film School in Łódź. He started working as a documentary filmmaker in far Siberia, visiting small villages and secluded societies. He began his career in 2006 with the short documentary The Seeds, followed by two other documentaries shot in Russia.

=== Career ===
He worked with many prominent Polish actors on his fiction short films. His The Refuge City was shown in main competition at Tribeca Film Festival, San Francisco Shorts, Next Reel in Singapur and Rhode Island International Film Festival among many others. He also worked at a theatre and directed János Háy’s performance Child Geza. He ran drama workshops at Studyjny Theatre. He has been working as a writer and screenwriter since 2008. Since 2009 he has run an independent production company, that has its place among Polish production houses focused on young filmmakers.

Kasperski is a Ministry of Culture "Młoda Polska Scholarship" holder for most talented young Polish artists. Since 2008 he has been an expert for the Ministry of Culture, evaluating film projects for financing by the Polish Film Institute. He was chosen by the European Film Academy to take part in annual Sunday in the country meetings. Polish newsmagazine Przekrój called him one of the most promising young Polish directors of his generation in article "20 Hopes of polish cinema".

== Filmography (school etudes excluded) ==
=== Director ===
- Icon (Ikona, 2016) – documentary: director, writer
- The High Frontier (Na granicy, 2016) – short thriller: director, writer
- A House at the end of the Road (Dom na końcu drogi, 2013) – short action: director, writer
- Chasm a.k.a. Abyss (Otchłań, 2009) – short documentary: director, writer
- The Seeds (Nasiona, 2005) – short documentary: director

=== Other works ===
- ORP Orzeł Jan Grudziński (2014) – short docudrama by Cezary Iber: writer
- Battleheart (Serce do walki, 2011) – short sport fiction by Tomasz Matuszczak: executive producer
- With Love (Z miłości, 2011) – feature film by Anna Jadowska: producer
- Come to me (Przyjdź do mnie, 2009) – short fiction by Ewa Banaszkiewicz: executive producer

== Awards (selection) ==
The Refuge City (Miasto ucieczki; school etude)

- Polish Independent Film Awards - 2007 Best Director
- International Independent Feature Film Festiwal in Warsaw - 2007 1st prize
- Media School International Film Festival - 2006 Special Prize
- International Student Film Festival of Beijing Film Academy - 2006 Audience Award
- International Film Festival Era New Horizons - 2007 Special Commendation
- Etiuda & Anima International Film Festival Cracow - 2006 Audience Award
- Sopot Film Festival - 2006 Special Commendation
- The Sleepwalkers Student Film Festival in Tallinn - 2006 Grand Prix
- Łodzią Po Wiśle - 2006 1st prize
- International Film Festival ZOOM, Jelenia Góra - 2007 Grand Prix
- Krakffa Film Festival - 2007 1st prize
- Independent Movie Festival KAN - 2007 Silver Cane

The Seeds

- L'Alternativa Festival de cinema independent de Barcelona - 2006 Special commendation
- Prix Europa Berlin - 2006 Nomination for Prix Europa and Special Commendation for documentary
- Festival International de cine documental de la Ciudad de Mexico - 2007 Special Jury Prize
- Kraków Film Festival - 2006 Grand Prix, Golden Hobby Horse
- Kraków Film Festival - 2006 Kodak Award
- Kraków Film Festival - 2006 Cracow Student Jury Award, Because we like it when the film avoids persuasion and the lives of the protagonists seem more intriguing than our own. It is with words small like seeds that you speak about a grand film. For the truth, the atmosphere and the shivers
- Moscow Festival - 2006 Golden Laurel, Best Artistic Film
- Media Festival Łódź - 2007 Special Jury Prize
- Perm Documentary Film Festival - 2006 Great Silver Nanook, Best documentary
- The CMU International Film Festival, Pittsburg - 2006 Grand Prix, International Short Film
- European Film Week ON/OFF Warsaw - 2006 Special Jury Prize
- AFI Discovery Channel Documentary Film Festival Silverdocs - 2006 Grand Prix, Short Documentary
- Big Sky Documentary Film Festival, Montana - 2007 Special Jury Prize If Chekov and Rembrandt had collaborated on documentary film, it might have the visual richness and dramatic insight of Seeds

== Official Screenings (selection) ==
- Cannes Film Festival - 2007 screening, Tous Les Cinémas du Monde
- INPUT Conference, Taipei - 2006 screening
- Tribeca Film Festival, New York - 2008 competition
- Beverly Hills Film Festival, Los Angeles - 2006 competition
- Dok Leipzig - 2007 competition

== See also ==
- Cinema of Poland
- National Film School in Łódź
- List of Polish language films
