= Soyer (film) =

- Film poster
- Directed by: Łukasz Barczyk
- Written by: Łukasz Barczyk
- Produced by: Łukasz Barczyk
- Starring: Cezary Kołacz, Maciej Musiałowski, Marianna Zydek, Diana Krupa, Kamil Wodka
- Cinematography: Karina Kleszczewska
- Production company: Łódź Film School
- Distributed by: Kino Świat
- Release date: 17 November 2017 (Poland)
- Running time: 90 minutes
- Country: Poland
- Language: Polish

Soyer is a 2017 Polish drama and comedy film directed by Łukasz Barczyk.

== Plot ==
The film is set in Łódź, Poland. The film's chief protagonist is a youngster named Soyer. His nickname derives from soya beans, the only food he permits himself to consume for his own well-being and that of other creatures. Soyer is described as either a "fool" or "a modern-day saint". His family treated him for mental disorders, although Soyer never considered himself ill-minded. Soyer considered himself Moses. After his mother went to the hospital, his care-taking became the responsibility of his sister, Małgośka and her husband, Janek Bryl, an ambitious banker. Soyer considered the couple's life to be overwhelmingly focused on the material world, whom he sets out to save them from, even against their own will.

== Cast ==
- Cezary Kołacz as Janek Bryl
- Maciej Musiałowski as Konrad Sadko "Soyer"
- Marianna Zydek as Małgośka
- Diana Krupa as the waitress
- Kamil Wodka as the head waiter
