= And Along Come Tourists =

2007 German drama film

- English-language poster
- Original title: Am Ende kommen Touristen
- Directed by: Robert Thalheim
- Screenplay by: Robert Thalheim
- Story by: Bernd Lange; Hans-Christian Schmid
- Produced by: Britta Knöller; Hans-Christian Schmid
- Starring: Alexander Fehling; Ryszard Ronczewski; Barbara Wysocka
- Cinematography: Yoliswa Gärtig
- Edited by: Stefan Kobe
- Music by: Anton K. Feist; Uwe Bossenz
- Distributed by: X Verleih AG (though Warner Bros.)
- Release date: 16 August 2007
- Running time: 85 minutes
- Country: Germany
- Language: German

And Along Come Tourists (German: Am Ende kommen Touristen) is a 2007 German drama film that was written and directed by Robert Thalheim. The principal characters are a young German doing civilian service at the former German Auschwitz concentration camp and an elderly camp survivor living there. Thalheim himself did his civilian service (Zivildienst) at the International Youth Meeting Center in Oświęcim/Auschwitz in 1996–1997, and portions of the film were shot at the Center and in the nearby town of Oświęcim, Poland. Filming was not permitted at the site of the concentration camp itself, where more than one million persons had been murdered by the end of the Second World War in 1945.

The film's title in German, Am Ende kommen Touristen, is taken from a volume of poetry published by Björn Kuhligk in 2000.

The principal performers are Alexander Fehling as Sven Lehnert and Ryszard Ronczewski as the survivor Stanislaw Krzemiński. Barbara Wysocka plays Ania Łanuszewska, a young Polish woman from Oświęcim with whom Sven develops a romantic relationship.

The film premièred on 16 August 2007 in Germany; its North American première was on 12 September 2007 at the Toronto International Film Festival. In 2010 and 2011 the film was broadcast on German television.

In 2007 Bonnie J. Gordon wrote of the film that it is "a quiet triumph ... economically blends modern life's truths, such as the fragility of 20-something love affairs, with universal themes, such as the search for meaning and the human need to expiate guilt." Jürgen Fauth wrote "Without ever resorting to preachiness, Thalheim, who was a Zivi at Auschwitz himself, offers incisive insights into the thorny contradictions and treacherous cross-currents of guilt and memory that turn any kind of exploration of the overbearing past into a minefield."

The film was nominated for the German Film Award for Best Fiction Film (the "Lola"). Alexander Fehling received the Förderpreis Neues Deutsches Kino (Advancement Prize for New German Cinema) for his performance as Sven. A version of the film was broadcast on German television in 2010 and 2011, for which Robert Thalheim won the Eberhard-Fechner Award.

A DVD version of the film was released in Europe in 2008. A region 1 DVD (for North America) has not been released.
