= Ryszard Ronczewski =

Polish actor (1930–2020)

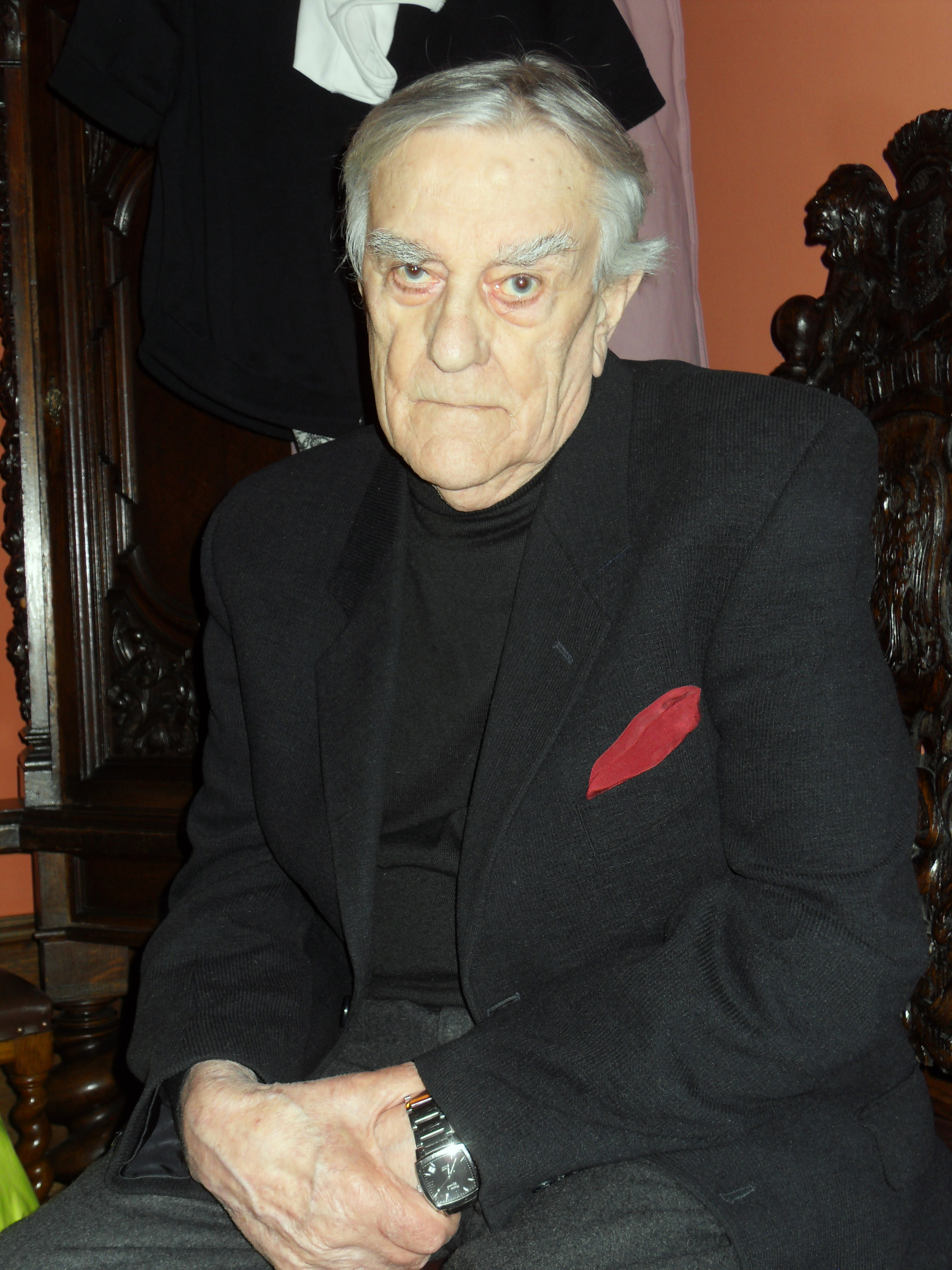
- Ronczewski in 2015
- Born: 27 June 1930; Puszkarnia, Poland (present-day part of Vilnius, Lithuania)
- Died: 17 October 2020 (aged 90); Sopot, Poland
- Occupation: Actor
- Years active: 1954–2020

Ryszard Ronczewski (27 June 1930 – 17 October 2020) was a Polish actor.

He appeared in more than seventy films from 1954 to 2021 (the premiere of The Wedding occurred a few months after his death).

Ronczewski died from COVID-19 on 17 October 2020, during the COVID-19 pandemic in Poland. He was 90.

== Selected filmography ==
Year	Title	Role	Notes
1962	The Two Who Stole the Moon		
1969	Colonel Wolodyjowski		
2003	An Ancient Tale: When the Sun Was a God		
2007	And Along Come Tourists		
2012	Kaddisch für einen Freund		
2013	West		
2021	The Wedding	Antoni Wilk	
