= Wojciech Has =

Polish film director (1925–2000)

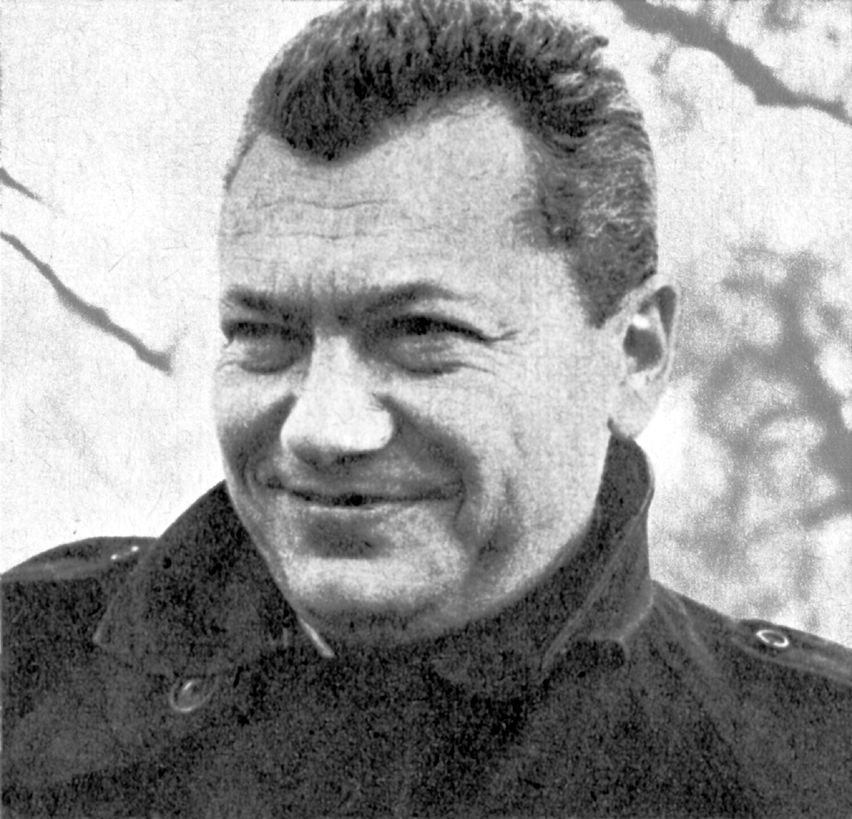
- Born: 1 April 1925; Kraków, Poland
- Died: 5 October 2000 (aged 75); Łódź, Poland
- Education: Łódź Film School
- Occupations: Film director, screenwriter
- Years active: 1958–1988

Wojciech Jerzy Has (1 April 1925 – 3 October 2000) was a Polish film director, screenwriter and film producer.

== Early life and studies ==
Wojciech Jerzy Has was born in Kraków. Has himself was agnostic. However, his family on both sides was Roman Catholic, although he was a philosemite. He had Jewish roots on his father's side, and Roman Catholic on his mother's. The name Has is the Hollandic, Yiddish and Germanised Jewish surname Haas (האָז), meaning hare in English.

During the wartime German occupation of Poland, Has studied at the Kraków Business and Commerce College and later clandestine underground classes at the Kraków Academy of Fine Arts – until it was disbanded in 1943. When the war ended, he went on to study at the reconstituted Academy of Fine Arts in Kraków. In 1946, Has completed a one-year course in film and began producing educational and documentary films at the Warsaw Documentary Film Studio, and in the 1950s moved on to work at Poland's premier filmmaking academy, the National Film Studio, in Łódź.

== Career ==
Has made his debut with Harmony (Harmonia, 1948), a medium-length feature, and began making full-length feature films in 1957. In 1974, he was appointed as professor in the directing department at the National Film School in Łódź. Throughout his long and prolific career, he directed such notable films as The Saragossa Manuscript, The Doll and The Hourglass Sanatorium (also known as The Sandglass).

Early on in his career, Has gained a reputation as an individualist who avoided political overtones in his art. He produced his most important films throughout the period when the Polish Film School was at its most prominent; however, his work possessed its own stylistic feeling that was independent of the overt political themes that dominated the prevailing Polish School. In practically all of his films, Has sought to create hermetic environments, in which the problems and storylines of his protagonists were always of secondary importance to the particular world he had created, characterized by an accumulation of random objects that formed a unique visual universe.

"If Wojciech Has had become a painter, he would surely have been a Surrealist," wrote the Polish critic Aleksander Jackiewicz. "He would have redrawn antique objects with all their real accoutrements and juxtaposed them in unexpected ways."

Has's oeuvre is commonly associated with Surrealist painting in Polish criticism. This is reinforced by the director's dream poetic and his use of objects, which are also characteristic of many canvasses by the Surrealists. Has also created a number of intimate psychological dramas during his career, such as How to Be Loved and Farewells, focusing on damaged individuals who have difficulty settling into life. In his work, he was fascinated by outsiders and people incapable of finding their place in reality.

Two themes remain evident in Has's output: one being his cinema of psychological analysis, the other his films of visionary form, in which he most often used the motif of a journey.

Polish writer Stanisław Lem, generally harshly critical of Polish cinema, singled out Has (his films The Saragossa Manuscript and How to Be Loved) and even talked with him about filming Lem's Star Diaries.

== Later life ==
From 1987 to 1989, Has was artistic director of the Rondo Film Studio and a member of the Polish State Cinema Committee. In 1989–1990, he served as dean of the directing department at the National Film School. In 1990, he became the school's provost and remained in this position for six years. He was the managing director and chief advisor at the school-affiliated Indeks Studio.

== Selected filmography ==
- The Noose (Pętla, 1958)
- Farewells (Pożegnania, 1958)
- One Room Tenants (Wspólny pokój, 1959)
- Goodbye to the Past (Rozstanie, 1961)
- Gold (Złoto, 1962)
- How to Be Loved (Jak być kochaną, 1962)
- The Saragossa Manuscript (Rękopis znaleziony w Saragossie, 1965)
- The Codes (Szyfry, 1966)
- The Doll (Lalka, 1968)
- The Hourglass Sanatorium (Sanatorium pod klepsydrą, 1973)
- Write and Fight (Pismak, 1984)
- Memoirs of a Sinner (Osobisty pamiętnik grzesznika... przez niego samego spisany, 1985)
- An Uneventful Story (Nieciekawa historia, 1986)
- The Tribulations of Balthazar Kober (Niezwykła podróż Balthazara Kobera, 1988)

== See also ==
- Cinema of Poland
- List of Polish language films
