= Piotr Sobociński Jr. =

Polish cinematographer (born 1983)

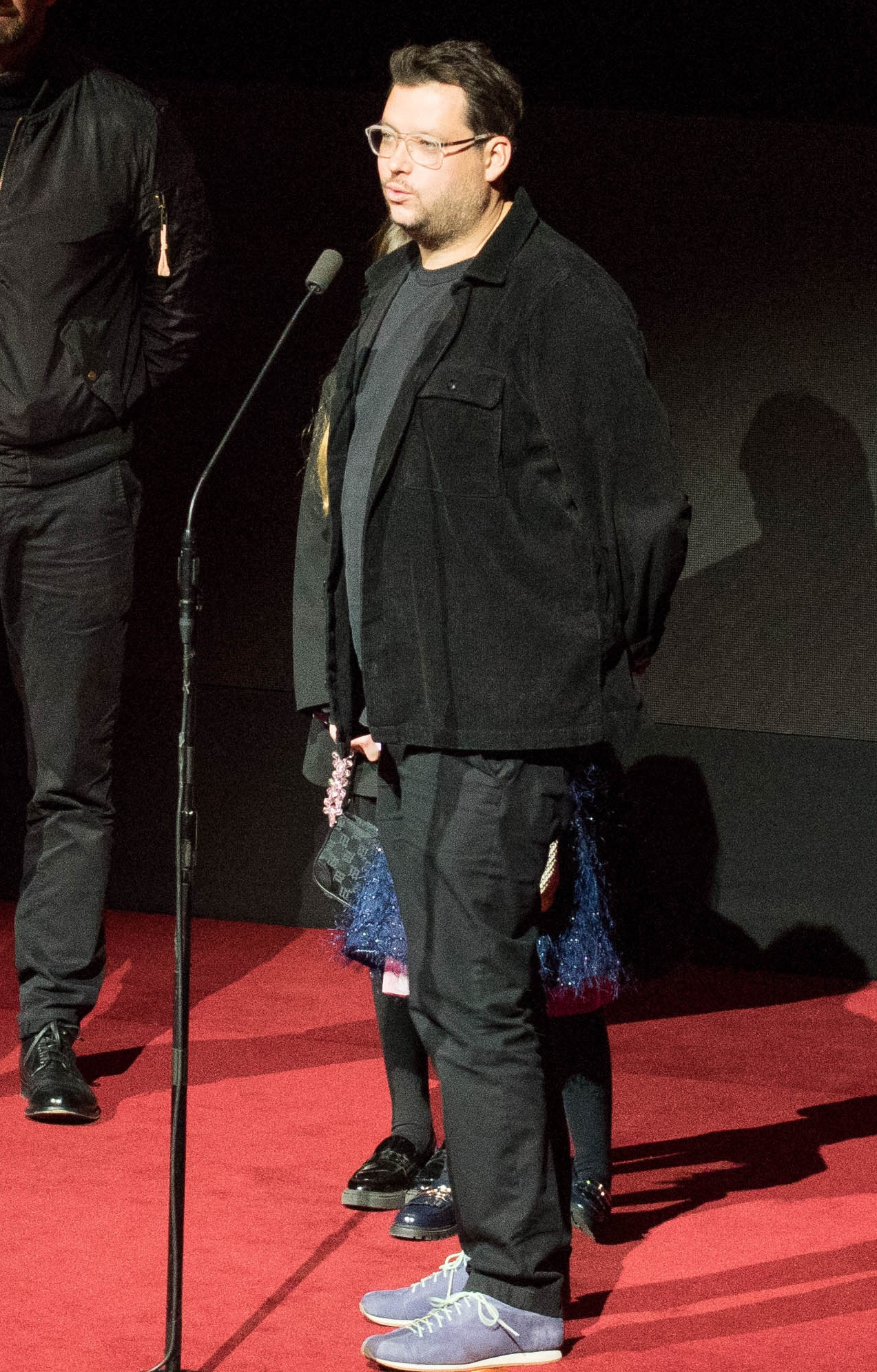
- Piotr Sobociński Jr., 2025
- Born: 3 November 1983 (age 43)
- Citizenship: Polish
- Occupation: Cinematographer

Piotr Sobociński Jr. (born 3 November 1983) is a cinematographer and screenwriter.

== Biography ==
The son of Hanna Mikuć and Piotr Sobociński, the grandson of Witold Sobociński, Wanda Chwiałkowska and Bohdan Mikuć, brother of Michał Sobociński and Maria Sobocińska. In 2008 he graduated in cinematography from Łódź Film School.

He won Polish Film Award Eagle for best cinematography in 2015, 2017, 2018, 2020, 2021 and 2022 respectively.

== Filmography ==
Source.

=== Director of photography ===
- Wygrany (2011)
- Róża (2011)
- Drogówka (2013)
- The Closed Circuit (2013)
- Bogowie (2014)
- Volhynia (2016)
- Cicha noc (2017)
- Najlepszy (2017)
- Nielegalni (2018), TV series
- Corpus Christi (2019)
- Jak najdalej stąd (2020)
- Hiacynt (2021)
- Wesele (2021)
- Kos (2023)
- Anniversary (2025)
- Ministranci (2025)
- The Doll (2026)

=== Screenwriter ===
- The Doll (2026)
