= Three Peaks (film) =

2017 film

- Film poster
- Directed by: Jan Zabeil
- Written by: Jan Zabeil
- Starring: Bérénice Bejo
- Release date: 4 August 2017 (Locarno)
- Running time: 104 minutes
- Countries: Italy; Germany
- Languages: French; German
- Box office: $19,530

Three Peaks is a 2017 German-Italian drama film written and directed by Jan Zabeil. It was screened in the Special Presentations section at the 2017 Toronto International Film Festival.

== Cast ==
- Bérénice Bejo
- Alexander Fehling
- Arian Montgomery
