= Michał Sobociński =

Polish cinematographer (born 1987)

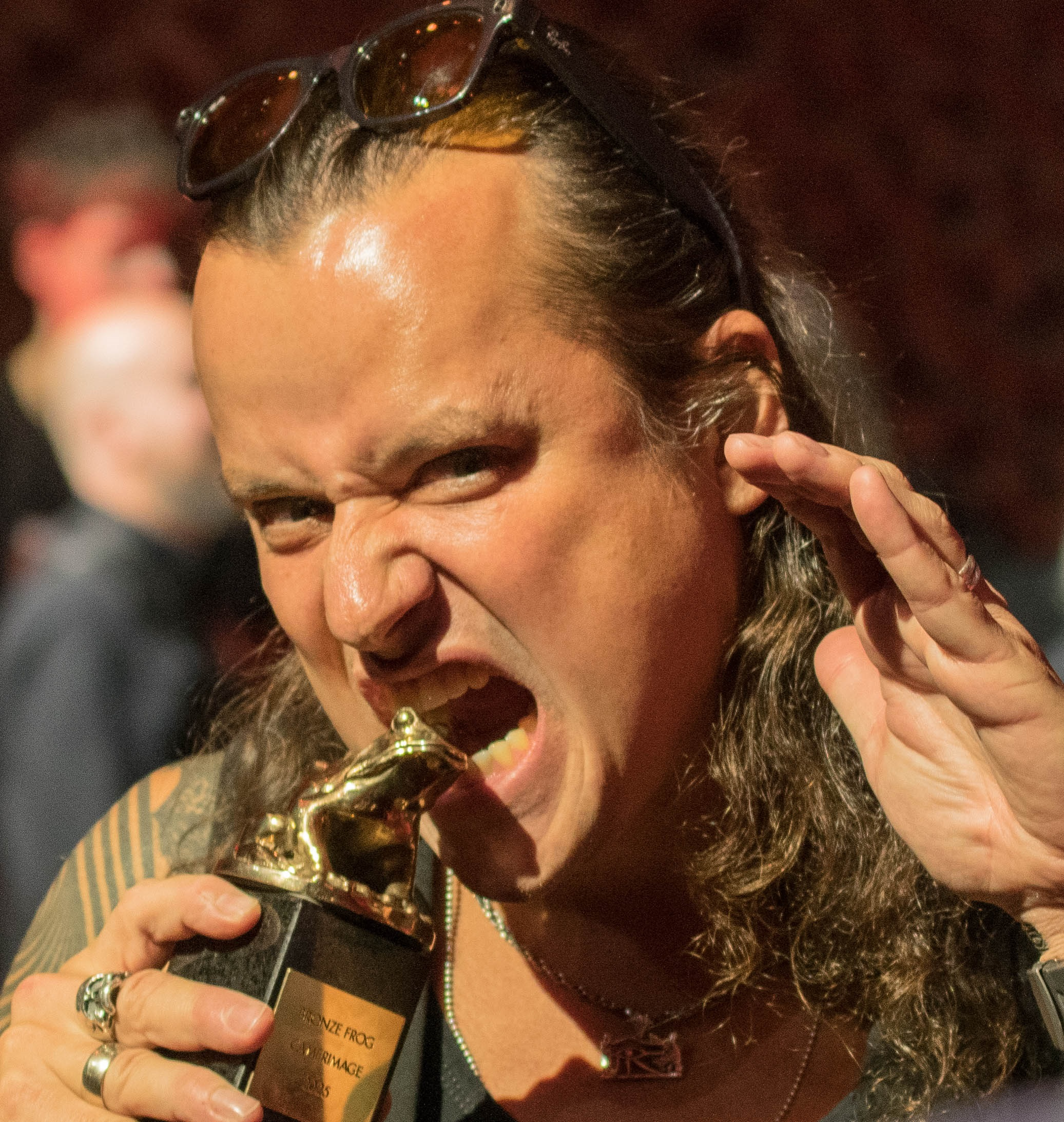
- Michał Sobociński at Camerimage, 2025
- Born: 10 August 1987 (age 38)
- Citizenship: Polish
- Occupation: Cinematographer

Michał Sobociński (born 10 August 1987) is a cinematographer.

== Biography ==
The son of Hanna Mikuć and Piotr Sobociński, the grandson of Witold Sobociński, Wanda Chwiałkowska and Bohdan Mikuć, brother of Piotr Sobociński Jr. and Maria Sobocińska. He is married to Natalia Rybicka, with whom he has a daughter, Helena.

In 2011 he graduated in cinematography from the Łódź Film School. He was elected a member of the European Film Academy.

== Filmography ==
- Obrazy z fabryki śmierci (2010)
- Świętokrzyskie sztetle (2012)
- Kamczatka (2013)
- Ojciec (2015)
- Konwój (2016)
- Sztuka kochania. Historia Michaliny Wisłockiej (2017)
- Miłość jest wszystkim (2018)
- The Disciple (2020)
- Filip (2023)
- Chopin, a Sonata in Paris (2025)
- The Hunting Wives (2025)

== Accolades ==
He won Polish Film Award for best cinematography for Filip and Bronze Frogue at the Camerimage for Chopin, a Sonata in Paris.
