= An Uneventful Story =

- Directed by: Wojciech Jerzy Has
- Written by: Wojciech Jerzy Has
- Based on: Скучная история (A Dreary Story) by Anton Chekhov
- Starring: Gustaw Holoubek; Hanna Mikuć; Anna Milewska
- Cinematography: Grzegorz Kedzierski
- Edited by: Barbara Lewandowska-Conio
- Music by: Jerzy Maksymiuk
- Distributed by: Zespol Filmowy "Rondo"
- Release date: 12 September 1983
- Running time: 106 minutes
- Country: Poland
- Language: Polish

An Uneventful Story (Polish: Nieciekawa historia) is a 1983 Polish film directed by Wojciech Jerzy Has, starring Gustaw Holoubek. The film is an adaptation of a short story by Anton Chekhov and tells the story of a professor of medicine who begins an affair with a young pupil.

== Plot ==
Michal (Gustaw Holoubek) is a middle aged professor of medicine in a provincial town who is bored by the mundane and superficial nature of his life, friends and family. Katarzyna (Hanna Mikuć), a young woman returns to the town and the two have an affair.

== Cast ==
- Marek Bargielowski as Michal
- Wladyslaw Dewoyno as Mikolaj
- Ewa Frackiewicz
- Janusz Gajos as Aleksander Gnekker
- Jacek Glowacki
- Gustaw Holoubek as Professor
- Jan Konieczny
- Janusz Michalowski as Piotr
- Hanna Mikuć as Katarzyna
- Anna Milewska as Weronika
- Wlodzimierz Musial
- Jerzy Zygmunt Nowak as Waiter
- Elwira Romanczuk as Liza
- Leszek Zentara as Student

== Production ==
Has first submitted a script for An Uneventful Story to the communist authorities as the follow-up project to The Saragossa Manuscript, when it was rejected he made The Codes (Szyfry) instead. The film was the director's first after a hiatus of 10 years, after Has had a number of projects blocked by the communist authorities because he had taken The Hourglass Sanatorium to the Cannes Film Festival against their wishes. It was filmed in the city of Tarnów in the Polish province of Małopolskie.

== Release ==
The film was released on 12 September 1983.

== See also ==
- The Diary of an Old Man, Canadian film based on the same source material
- Cinema of Poland
- List of Polish language films
