= The Winner (2011 film) =

- Polish theatrical release poster
- Directed by: Wiesław Saniewski
- Written by: Wiesław Saniewski
- Produced by: Grażyna Molska
- Starring: Pawel Szajda; Janusz Gajos; Wojciech Pszoniak
- Cinematography: Piotr Kukla; Piotr Sobociński Jr.
- Edited by: Jarosław Barzan
- Music by: Carlos Libedinski; Fernando del Castillo; Marcello Toth; Mariano Castro
- Production company: Saco Films (film company)
- Distributed by: Forumfilm
- Release date: March 11, 2011
- Running time: 111 minutes
- Countries: United States; Poland
- Languages: English and Polish
- Budget: $3,300,000

The Winner (Polish: Wygrany) is a 2011 American-Polish co-production written and directed by Wieslaw Saniewski and starring Pawel Szajda, Janusz Gajos, Wojciech Pszoniak and Marta Żmuda-Trzebiatowska.

== Premise ==
Oliver (played by Pawel Szajda is a young and talented pianist. When his life and promising career suddenly collapse, he finds an unexpected help in a retired math teacher, now a compulsive horse race gambler (played by Janusz Gajos).

== Production ==
The Winner was filmed in Chicago, in Baden-Baden, Wrocław and Lądek-Zdrój. Film's soundtrack includes music of Chopin, three Elvis Presley's songs and tango.
