= Write and Fight =

- Directed by: Wojciech Jerzy Has
- Written by: Wojciech Jerzy Has
- Based on: Pismak by Wladyslaw Terlecki
- Starring: Wojciech Wysocki; Zdzislaw Wardejnc; Jan Peszek
- Cinematography: Grzegorz Kędzierski
- Edited by: Barbara Lewandowska-Conio
- Music by: Jerzy Maksymiuk
- Production company: Wytwórnia Filmów Fabularnych (Łódź)
- Distributed by: Zespol Filmowy "Rondo"
- Release date: 23 September 1985
- Running time: 113 minutes
- Country: Poland
- Language: Polish

Write and Fight (Polish: Pismak) is a 1985 Polish film directed by Wojciech Jerzy Has, starring Wojciech Wysocki, Zdzislaw Wardejnc and Jan Peszek. The film is an adaptation of a novel by Wladyslaw Terlecki and tells the story of a young journalist locked in a prison cell with a safebreaker and a priest, and the stories they tell.

== Plot ==
Set during the First World War, Raphael (Wojciech Wysocki), is a young journalist with literary ambitions who is arrested and put in prison for publishing an anti-clerical magazine called "The Devil". There he is given a cell with a famous safecracker (Zdzislaw Wardejn) and Sixtus (Jan Peszek), a taciturn former monk charged with murder. The writer forms the idea for a novel based on the stories his cellmates share, however when he contracts typhoid fever it becomes hard for him to distinguish what is real and what is imaginary.

== Cast ==
- Grzegorz Heromiński as Hunchback
- Gustaw Holoubek as Investigating Judge
- Gabriela Kownacka as Maria
- Andrzej Krukowski as Gruźlik
- Janusz Michałowski as Prison Doctor
- Hanna Mikuć as Sixtus' lover
- Jan Peszek as Sixtus
- Zdzislaw Wardejn as Boxer
- Wojciech Wysocki as Raphael
- Jerzy Zelnik as Writer
- Marzena Trybal as the safecracker's friend
- Gustaw Lutkiewicz as warden
- John Paul Raven as jailer
- Jerzy Zygmunt Nowak as the agent who arrested Raphael
- Andrew Szenajch as officer
- Jerzy Moes as Austrian officer

== Release ==
The film was theatrically released in Poland on 23 September 1985.

== See also ==
- Cinema of Poland
- List of Polish language films
