= Hearts in Atlantis (film) =

2001 film by Scott Hicks

- Theatrical release poster
- Directed by: Scott Hicks
- Screenplay by: William Goldman
- Based on: Hearts in Atlantis by Stephen King
- Produced by: Kerry Heysen
- Starring: Anthony Hopkins; Anton Yelchin; Hope Davis; Mika Boorem; David Morse
- Cinematography: Piotr Sobociński
- Edited by: Pip Karmel
- Music by: Mychael Danna
- Production companies: Castle Rock Entertainment; Village Roadshow Pictures; NPV Entertainment
- Distributed by: Warner Bros. Pictures
- Release date: September 28, 2001
- Running time: 101 minutes
- Country: United States
- Language: English
- Budget: $31 million
- Box office: $30.9 million

Hearts in Atlantis is a 2001 American mystery drama film directed by Scott Hicks and starring Anthony Hopkins and Anton Yelchin. It is loosely adapted from Stephen King's Dark Tower tie-in "Low Men in Yellow Coats," a novella in the 1999 collection Hearts in Atlantis after which the film was named.

The film is dedicated to the memory of its cinematographer, Piotr Sobociński, who died a few months before its release.

== Plot ==
Middle-aged photographer and businessman Bobby Garfield returns to his old hometown upon learning that his childhood best friend, decorated soldier John "Sully" Sullivan, has died in a traffic accident. There, he begins recollecting his past when he visits his childhood home, which has long since been abandoned.

During a summer in the 1960s, an eleven-year-old Bobby lives with his widowed mother, self-centered Liz Garfield, and has two friends, Carol Gerber and Sully. They experienced many things together, the most mysterious of which was meeting the older gentleman Ted Brautigan, whom Liz takes in as a boarder.

Ted takes the lonely Bobby under his wing, while his mother is busy with her job. They form a father-son bond, and it slowly becomes evident that Ted has some psychic and telekinetic powers, which are why he has come to this sleepy town. In due course Ted explains that he has escaped the grasp of the "Low Men", strange people who would stop at nothing to get him back under their control.

After reading Bobby's mind and realizing that the boy dreams of owning a bicycle, Ted kindly offers Bobby $1 a week in exchange for his reading the newspaper to him out loud. Bobby quickly figures out that Ted has some other purpose in mind. Mysteriously, Ted asks Bobby to keep an eye on the neighborhood looking for any signs of the "low men", like announcements about missing pets. Bobby sees one, but does not tell Ted, afraid to lose his new friend.

Bobby, Carol and John have frequent conflicts with the local town bully, Harry Doolin, whom Ted scares away by looking into his mind and finding out that his violence is used to cover up his secret cross-dressing. However, at one point, Harry harasses and injures Carol.

When Ted manipulates Carol's dislocated shoulder into place, Liz arrives. As she has been raped by her boss on the trip, she mistakenly believes that Ted is a child molester. Liz is confronted by Ted's ability to tell her the truth about what she has been through, and how her behavior is affecting her relationship with her son, providing another reason that Ted must leave.

Ted is eventually captured with the help of a tip from Liz. As a form of closure, Ted yells to Bobby as he is being driven away that he would not have missed a moment with him "not for all the world", and later Bobby mirrors the same feelings.

Bobby is later confronted by Harry, but he grabs the latter's baseball bat and beats him with it. Liz finds a new job in Boston so moves the family there. Before he leaves, Bobby and Carol say their goodbyes and share a final kiss.

Returning to the present, Bobby turns to leave his old home, wherein he meets a young girl named Molly. They strike up a conversation wherein she reveals that she is Carol's daughter, who died not long ago. Bobby gives Molly a photograph of a young Carol as they connect.

== Cast ==
- Anthony Hopkins as Ted Brautigan
- Anton Yelchin as Bobby Garfield
  - David Morse as adult Bobby Garfield
- Hope Davis as Liz Garfield
- Mika Boorem as Carol Gerber
  - Boorem also plays Molly, Carol's daughter, whom the adult Bobby meets in the present.
- Deirdre O'Connell as Mrs. Gerber
- Will Rothhaar as John "Sully" Sullivan
- Timmy Reifsnyder as Harry Doolin
- Alan Tudyk as Monte Man
- Tom Bower as Len Files
- Celia Weston as Alana Files
- Adam LeFevre as Don Biderman

== Production ==
Director Scott Hicks stated that, after reviewing casting tapes, Anton Yelchin was his top choice to play Bobby Garfield. Hicks then brought Yelchin to Charleston, where Anthony Hopkins was filming Hannibal, to read with Hopkins. Hopkins was impressed with Yelchin and was in agreement with Hicks about casting him in the film. Hearts in Atlantis was Yelchin's feature film debut.

The film was shot in Richmond and Staunton, Virginia.

== Release ==
=== Box office ===
Hearts in Atlantis opened at #3 behind Don't Say a Word and Zoolander, earning $9,021,494 in its opening weekend at the U.S. box office. The film would eventually gross a domestic total of $24,185,781, somewhat short of its $31 million budget, but with an international $6,733,634, it would total $30,919,415.

== Reception ==
Hearts in Atlantis received mixed reviews. On Rotten Tomatoes, it has an approval rating of 49% based on reviews from 137 critics, with an average score of 5.8/10 and the consensus states "Hearts in Atlantis is well-acted and beautiful to look at, but the movie is nothing more than a mood piece." According to Metacritic, which sampled the opinions of 30 critics and calculated a score of 55 out of 100, the film received "mixed or average" reviews. Audiences polled by CinemaScore gave the film an average grade of "B" on an A+ to F scale.

Roger Ebert gave it three and a half out of four stars.

=== Accolades ===
| Year | Award | Category | Recipient(s) | Result | Ref(s) |
|---|---|---|---|---|---|
| 2001 | Camerimage | Bronze Frog | Piotr Sobociński | Won | |
| 2001 | Camerimage | Golden Frog | Piotr Sobociński | Nominated | |
| 2002 | Las Vegas Film Critics Society Awards | Youth in Film | Anton Yelchin | Nominated | |
| 2002 | Phoenix Film Critics Society Awards Awards | Best Youth Performance | Anton Yelchin | Nominated | |
| 2002 | Phoenix Film Critics Society Awards Awards | Best Screenplay - Adaptation | William Goldman | Nominated | |
| 2002 | Satellite Awards | Best Cinematography | Piotr Sobociński | Nominated | |
| 2002 | Young Artist Awards | Best Performance in a Feature Film - Leading Young Actor | Anton Yelchin | Won | |
| 2002 | Young Artist Awards | Best Performance in a Feature Film - Supporting Young Actor | Will Rothhaar | Nominated | |
| 2002 | Young Artist Awards | Best Performance in a Feature Film - Supporting Young Actress | Mika Boorem | Nominated | |
| 2002 | Young Artist Awards | Best Family Feature Film - Drama | Hearts in Atlantis | Nominated | |
