= Maria Sobocińska =

Polish actress (born 1994)

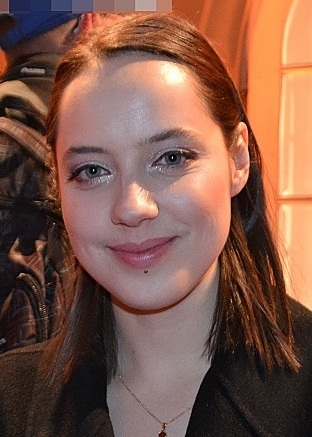
- Sobocińska in 2020
- Born: 24 February 1994 (age 32); Warsaw, Poland
- Education: National Academy of Dramatic Art
- Occupation: Actress
- Years active: 2016–present
- Parents: Piotr Sobociński (father); Hanna Mikuć (mother)
- Relatives: Piotr Sobociński Jr. (brother); Michał Sobociński (brother); Witold Sobociński (grandfather)

Maria Sobocińska (Polish pronunciation: [ˈmarja sɔbɔˈt͡ɕij̃ska] born 24 February 1994) is a Polish actress.

== Biography ==
Sobocińska was born to cinematographer Piotr Sobociński and actress Hanna Mikuć. She has two brothers, Piotr and Michał. Her grandfather, Witold Sobociński, was also a cinematographer. She originally wanted to pursue medicine, but later chose to apply to drama school. She graduated from the National Academy of Dramatic Art in 2018.

In 2016, she made her professional acting debut in Wojciech Smarzowski's Volhynia.

== Filmography ==
=== Film ===
Year	Title	Role	Ref.
2016	Volhynia	Helena Głowacka-Huk	
2018	Clergy	Nun	
2018	Miłość jest wszystkim	Elżbieta Wojnar	
2019	All for My Mother	Agnes	
2019	Mister T.	Dagna	
2019	Alzur's Legacy	Stokrotka	
2021	The Wedding	Inka	
2024	Drużyna AA	Karolina	
2025	Home Sweet Home	Magda	

=== Television ===
Year	Title	Role	Notes	Ref.
2018	Komisarz Alex	Milla Grodecka	1 episode	
2019	Stulecie Winnych	Zosia	4 episodes	
2019	The Pleasure Principle	Helena	1 episode	
2019	The Trap	Employee	1 episode	
2021	Raven	Klaudia Deren	5 episodes	
2021–2023	Sexify	Paulina Malinowska	16 episodes	
2022	The Behaviorist	Emilia Edling	8 episodes	
2026	Proud	Kiki		

== Awards and nominations ==
Award	Year	Category	Work	Result	Ref.
Polish Film Awards	2020	Best Actress	Mister T.	Nominated	
Polish Film Awards	2021	Best Supporting Actress	All for My Mother	Nominated	
