= Film New Europe Association =

The Film New Europe Association (FNE) is a networking body and free online news wire for film institutions in Central and Eastern Europe and the Baltic region. It is based in Warsaw, Poland and has an office in Prague. It was founded by Andrzej Wajda. Its advisory panel includes Czech director Jan Svěrák, Polish screenwriter Krzysztof Zanussi, Slovak directors Martin Šulík and Juraj Jakubisko, Lithuanian director Šarūnas Bartas and Hungarians, screenwriter István Szabó and cinematographer Lajos Koltai.
