= Witold Sobociński =

Polish cinematographer (1929–2018)

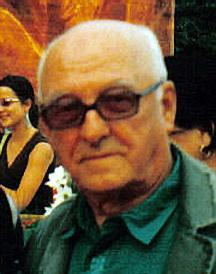
- Born: October 15, 1929
- Died: November 19, 2018 (aged 89)
- Education: National Film School in Łódź
- Occupations: Cinematographer; musician; teacher
- Children: Piotr Sobociński (son)
- Relatives: Piotr Sobociński Jr. (grandson); Michał Sobociński (grandson); Maria Sobocińska (granddaughter)

Witold Sobociński (Polish pronunciation: [ˈvitɔlt sɔbɔˈt͡ɕij̃skʲi]; 15 October 1929 – 19 November 2018) was a Polish cinematographer, academic teacher as well as former jazz musician. Sobociński was a graduate of the renowned National Film School in Łódź. While in college, he was a member of the pioneer jazz band Melomani, in which he played the drums.

After graduation, he worked with Polish Television and Film Studios Czolowka, as a cameraman. In 1967 he debuted as a cinematographer. Sobociński cooperated with several notable directors, including Andrzej Wajda, Krzysztof Zanussi and Roman Polanski. He was a lecturer at the film school in Łódź from 1980 until his death in 2018. He was known for his forward and uncompromising teaching style, his emphasis on narrative over visual beauty, and his commitment to film education. Sobociński was awarded several prizes; he also co-produced a number of notable movies. Just over a week before his death, he was awarded the Lifetime Achievement Award at the prestigious Camerimage film festival.

His son Piotr Sobociński (1958–2001) was also a cinematographer.

== Selected filmography ==
- Hands Up! (Ręce do góry; 1967: withheld by censors, 1981: re-edited/released)
- The Adventures of Gerard (1970)
- Family Life (Życie rodzinne; 1971)
- The Wedding (Wesele; 1972)
- The Hourglass Sanatorium (Sanatorium pod klepsydrą; 1973)
- The Promised Land (Ziemia obiecana; 1975)
- O-Bi, O-Ba: The End of Civilization (O-bi, o-ba: Koniec cywilizacji; 1985)
- Pirates (1986)
- Frantic (1988)
- Torrents of Spring (1989)
- The Gateway of Europe (Wrota Europy; 1999)
