= Alexander Fehling =

German film and stage actor

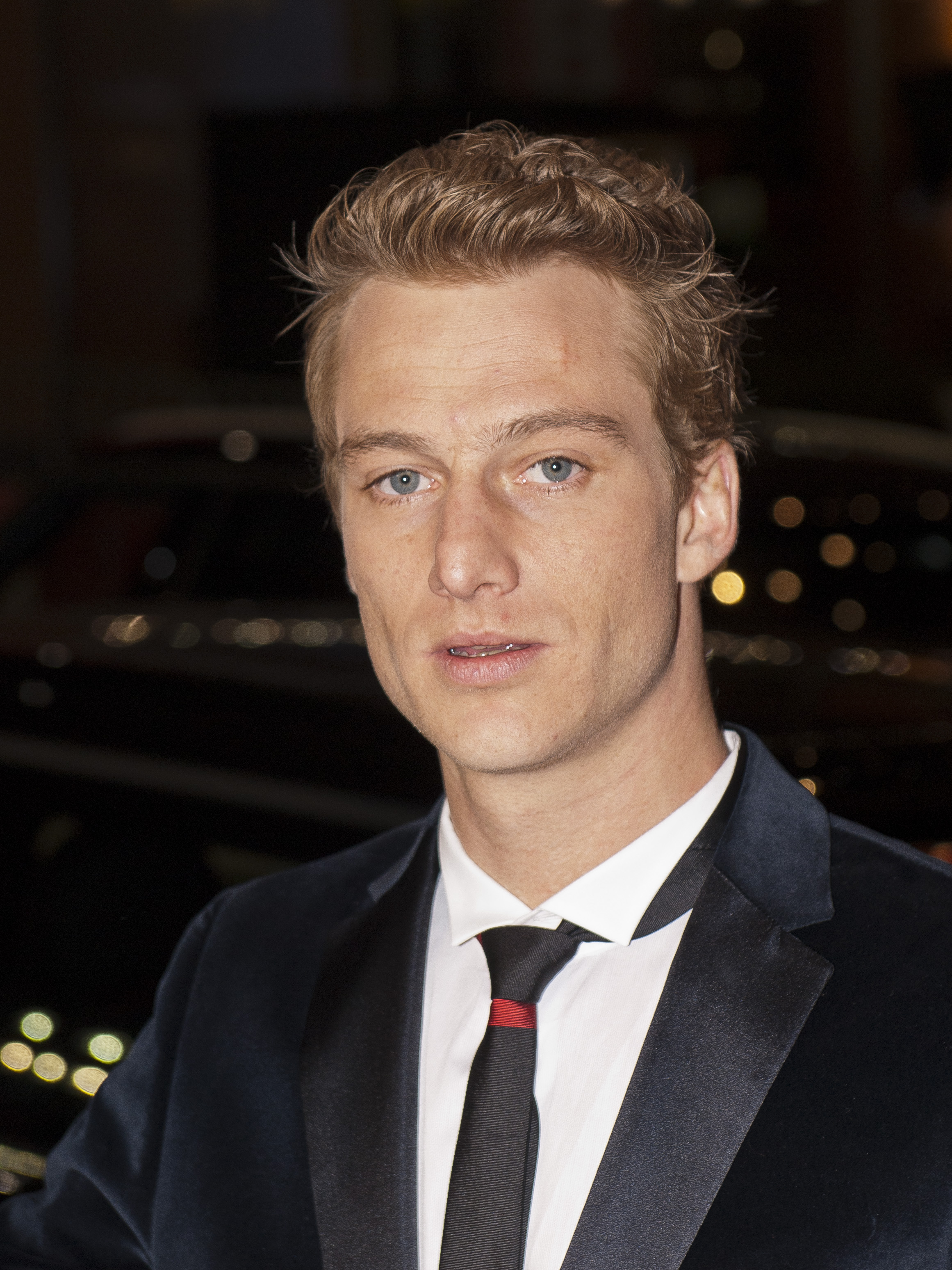
- Fehling after receiving the Shooting Stars Award 2011
- Born: March 29, 1981 (age 45); East Berlin, East Germany
- Occupation: Actor
- Years active: 2007–present

Alexander Fehling is a German film and stage actor. He is best known for portraying Master Sgt. Wilhelm in the 2009 Quentin Tarantino World War II film Inglourious Basterds, and as Jonas Hollander in season 5 of the Showtime original series Homeland as the boyfriend of Claire Danes's character Carrie Mathison.

== Early life and education ==
Alexander Fehling was born on March 29, 1981, in East Berlin, East Germany.

He studied acting at the Ernst Busch Academy of Dramatic Arts from 2003 until 2007.

== Career ==
Fehling won the OE Hasse Prize from the Academy of Arts, Berlin, for his role as Prince in the stage production of Schneewittchen (Snow White).

He received the Förderpreis Deutscher Film award in the Best Actor category for his portrayal of Sven Lehnert in the 2006 film And Along Come Tourists.

Fehling is best known to English-speaking audiences for his role as German Master Sgt. Wilhelm in Quentin Tarantino's 2009 World War II film Inglourious Basterds. He also dubs his performance in the German version of the film.

Fehling appeared as a series regular in the fifth season of the Showtime original series Homeland, which began airing in October 2015. He played Jonas Hollander, a legal counsel for the Düring Foundation and boyfriend of Claire Danes's character Carrie Mathison.

== Awards ==
- 2005: The O.E. Hasse-Preis of the Akademie der Künste for his role as Prince in Robert Walser's 1901 drama Schneewittchen (Snow White)
- 2007: The Förderpreis Deutscher Film (Young German Cinema Award) in the best actor category for his role as Sven Lehnert in And Along Come Tourists (2006)
- 2011: The Shooting Stars Award by European Film Promotion at the Berlin International Film Festival.

== Theatre credits ==
- Schneewittchen by Robert Walser, directed by Thorsten Lensing and Jan Hein (2005)
- Glaube Liebe Hoffnung by Ödön von Horváth; directed by Thomas Dannemann (2005)
- Die lustigen Nibelungen by Oscar Straus, directed by Robert Borgmann (2006)
- Wallensteins Lager / Die Piccolomini / Wallensteins Tod by Friedrich Schiller, directed by Peter Stein (2007)

== Filmography ==
- And Along Come Tourists (2007, Director: Robert Thalheim) – Sven Lehnert
- Buddenbrooks (2007, Director: Heinrich Breloer) – Morten Schwarzkopf
- Storm (2009, Director: Hans-Christian Schmid) – Patrick Färber
- Inglourious Basterds (2009, Director: Quentin Tarantino) – Master Sgt. Wilhelm / Pola Negri
- 13 Semester (2009, Director: Frieder Wittich) – Bernd
- Goethe! (2010, Director: Philipp Stölzl) – Johann Goethe
- If Not Us, Who? (2011) – Andreas Baader
- The River Used to Be a Man (2011)
- Shores of Hope (2012) – Cornelis Schmidt
- Erased (The Expatriate) (2012) – Floyd
- Buddy (2013, Director: Michael Bully Herbig) – Eddie Weber
- Labyrinth of Lies (2014) – Johann Radmann
- Posthumous (2014) – Erik Alder
- Atomic Falafel (2015) – Oli
- In Times of Fading Light (2017) – Sascha Umnitzer
- Fatal News (2015) – David Burger
- Three Peaks (2017, Director: Jan Zabeil) – Aaron
- The Captain (2017) – Junker
- Das Ende der Wahrheit (2019) – Patrick Lemke
- A Hidden Life (2019) – Lawyer Feldman
- The Space Between the Lines (2019) – Leo
- Seneca – On the Creation of Earthquakes (2023) - Decimus
- Scorched Earth (2024)
- Eurotrash (2026)
