= Piotr Sobociński =

Polish cinematographer (1958–2001)

- Born: 3 February 1958; Łódź, Polish People's Republic
- Died: 26 March 2001 (aged 43); Vancouver, Canada
- Education: National Film School in Łódź
- Years active: 1979–2001
- Spouse: Hanna Mikuć
- Children: Piotr Sobociński Jr.; Michał Sobociński; Maria Sobocińska
- Father: Witold Sobociński

Piotr Sobociński (Polish pronunciation: [ˈpjɔtr sɔbɔˈt͡ɕij̃skʲi]; 3 February 1958 – 26 March 2001) was a Polish cinematographer. He was nominated for the Academy Award for Best Cinematography for Three Colours: Red in 1994. He was the son of Polish cinematographer Witold Sobociński.

== Early life ==
Born in 1958, in Łódź, Poland, as a youngster, Sobociński felt led in his father's footsteps. He studied at the National Film School in Łódź and earned his degrees in 1987.

== Career ==
He worked with noted Polish director, Krzysztof Kieślowski in many films, starting with Dekalog (1988) and culminating with Kieślowski's final film, Three Colours: Red (1994), for which Sobociński won his first award the Silver Frog Award at Camerimage, Poland's International Film Festival of the Art of Cinematography in 1994, as well as an Oscar nomination the same year. In the following year, he won the Golden Frog award for The Seventh Room and, in 1997, received a Golden Frog nomination for Marvin’s Room.

His career hit a peak in the mid-1990s when he was asked by Ron Howard to work on the film Ransom starring Mel Gibson and Rene Russo.

== Death ==
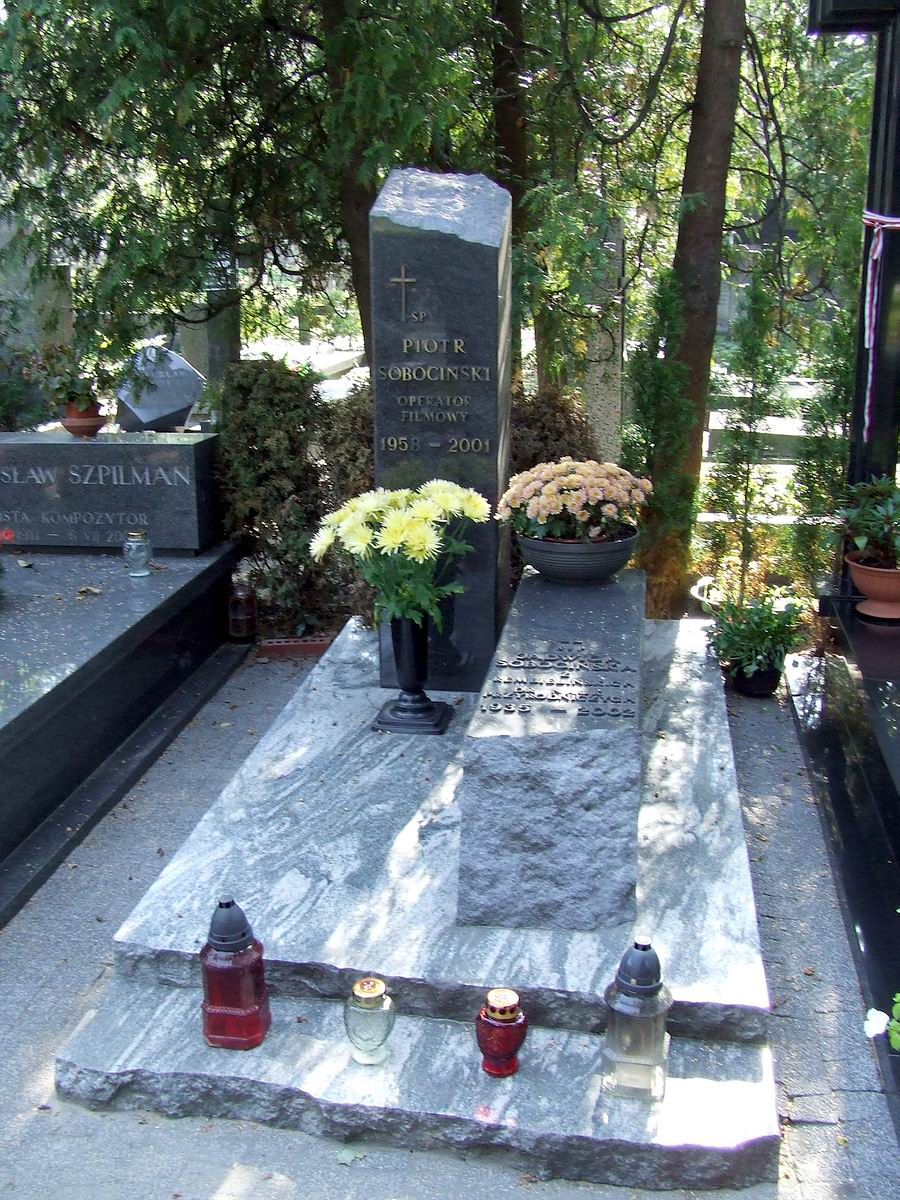
Sobociński's grave at Powązki Cemetery

While filming Trapped (aka 24 Hours) in 2001, he suffered a massive heart attack and died in his sleep in Vancouver, British Columbia. He was buried at the Powązki Military Cemetery in Warsaw, Poland. Hearts in Atlantis, released a few months after his death, and Trapped are dedicated to him.

His sons, Piotr and Michał, are both cinematographers. His daughter, Maria, is an actress.

== Filmography ==
=== Feature film ===
Year	Title	Director	Notes
1985	Miłość z listy przebojów	Marek Nowicki	
1986	Tanie pieniądze	Tomasz Lengren	
1987	Magnat	Filip Bajon	
1989	Lawa	Tadeusz Konwicki	
1989	Pension Sonnenschein	Filip Bajon	
1990	Bal na dworcu w Koluszkach	Filip Bajon	
1990	Potyautasok	Sándor Söth	
1992	A nagy postarablás	Sándor Söth	
1993	Die Wildnis	Werner Masten	
1994	Three Colours: Red	Krzysztof Kieślowski	
1995	The Seventh Room	Márta Mészáros	
1996	Ransom	Ron Howard	
1996	Marvin's Room	Jerry Zaks	
1998	Twilight	Robert Benton	
2001	Hearts In Atlantis	Scott Hicks	Posthumous release
2001	Angel Eyes	Luis Mandoki	Posthumous release
2002	Trapped *	Luis Mandoki	Posthumous release

* Shared credit with Frederick Elmes

=== Television ===
Miniseries

Year	Title	Director	Notes
1988	Dekalog	Krzysztof Kieślowski	Segments Three and Nine
1989	Biała wizytówka	Filip Bajon	
1993	Die Piefke-Saga	Werner Masten	Episode "Die Erfüllung"

TV series

Year	Title	Director	Notes
1992-1993	Unser Lehrer Doktor Specht	Werner Masten	21 episodes
1995	Frauenarzt Dr. Markus Merthin	Matthias Gohlke	Episodes "Alte Bekannte" and "Pläne"
1995	Die Straßen von Berlin	Werner Masten	Episode "Babuschka"

== Accolades ==
Year	Award	Category	Title	Result
1994	Academy Awards	Best Cinematography	Three Colours: Red	Nominated
2001	Satellite Awards	Best Cinematography	Hearts In Atlantis	Nominated
