= Łódź Film School =

Film academy in Poland

Coordinates: 51°45′28″N 19°28′21″E

- Państwowa Wyższa Szkoła Filmowa, Telewizyjna i Teatralna im. Leona Schillera
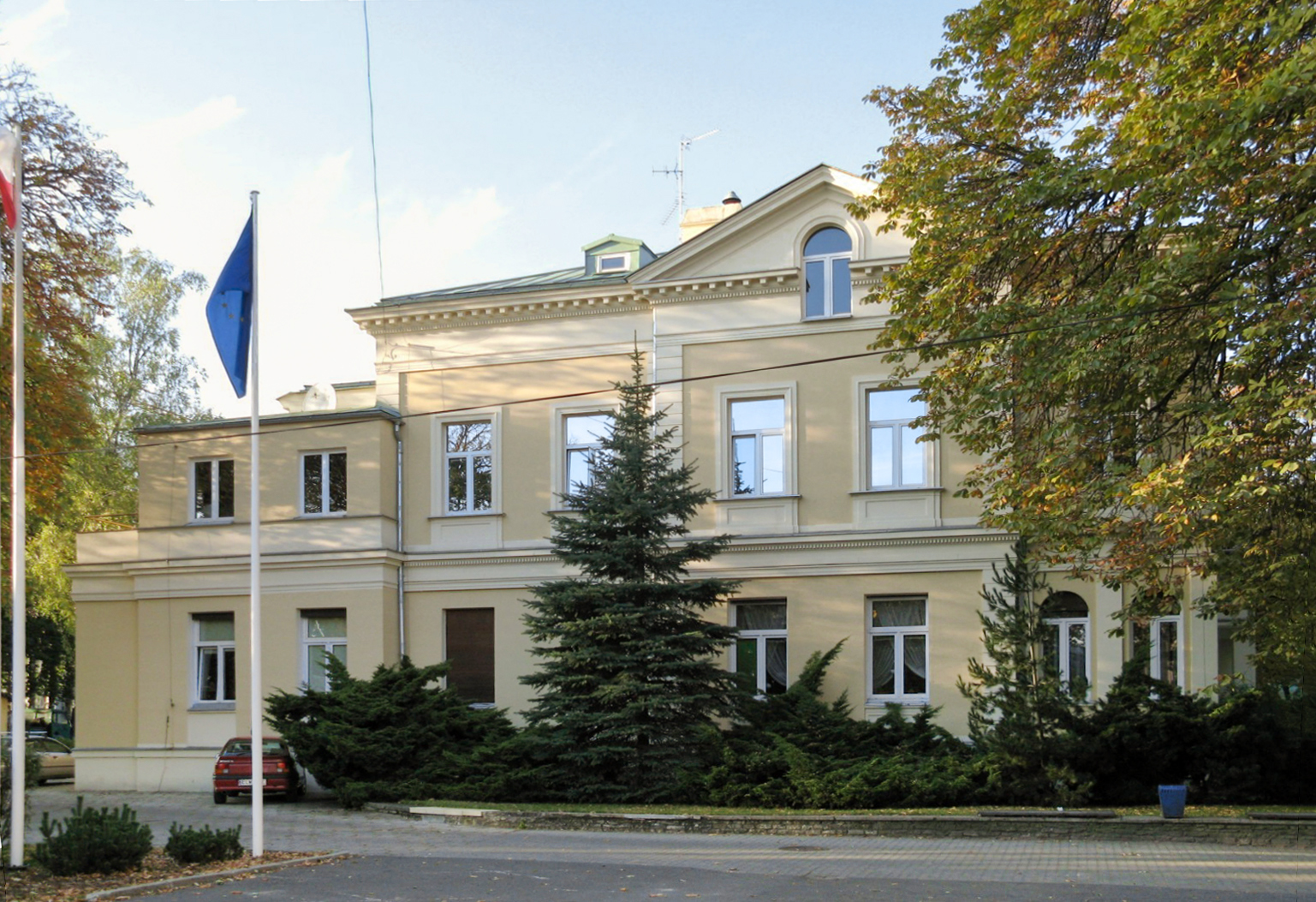
- Łódź Film School (Oskar Kon Palace)
- Established: 8 March 1948
- Affiliations: CILECT
- Rector: Milenia Fiedler
- Location: Targowa 61, 90-323, Łódź, Poland
- Campus: Urban
- Website: filmschool.lodz.pl

The Polish National Film, Television and Theatre School in Łódź (Polish: Państwowa Wyższa Szkoła Filmowa, Telewizyjna i Teatralna im. Leona Schillera w Łodzi), commonly known as the Łódź Film School (Polish: Szkoła Filmowa w Łodzi), is a Polish film school for future directors, actors, cinematographers, producers, animators, photographers, editors and scriptwriters of both cinema and television. It was founded on 8 March 1948 in Łódź (Lodz).

== History ==
From 1945 Jerzy Toeplitz initiated the founding of a national Polish film school, and in 1947, was one of the co-founders of the national film school in Poland, now known as Łódź Film School. It was officially founded on 8 March 1948 in Łódź (pronunciation: [woodge] — IPA: /wut͡ɕ/). Other founding professors were Jerzy Bossak, Wanda Jakubowska, Stanisław Wohl, and Antoni Bohdziewicz. Toeplitz was first a lecturer and director of the school from 1949 to 1952, and then rector from 1957 to 1968.

Until 1958, the school existed as two separate schools: one for actors and the other for filmmakers. The schools and the Polish cinema industry were moved from Warsaw to the nearby city of Łódź after World War II. This move was initially seen as a temporary measure, thus the name of the actors' school was The National Higher School of Theatre in Warsaw with seat in Łódź. Its creator and the first rector was the Polish actor Leon Schiller, current namesake of the school. In 1949, it was divided into two branches; one actually moved to Warsaw and the other one remained in Łódź under the directorship of Kazimierz Dejmek (since 1950).

The years leading up to the merger in 1958 were those in which notable artists of the Polish Film School created the reputation of the Łódź Film School as the most liberal and least Communist institution of higher education in Poland. Among the most notable alumni of that period were Andrzej Munk, Janusz Morgenstern, Andrzej Wajda, and Kazimierz Kutz. In 1954, they were joined by Roman Polanski.

After 1958, the school became a cultural think-tank of Poland, with many outsiders and artists not supported by the Communist authorities joining it. Various discussion clubs and relative liberty of speech promoted by the new rector, Jerzy Toeplitz, added to its value. For instance, two of the students of the university (Jerzy Matuszkiewicz and Witold Sobociński) became the first jazz musicians in Poland after World War II to be allowed by the authorities to organize a concert. Kirk Douglas visited the school in 1966. His visit was documented in the self-titled documentary Kirk Douglas.

After the events of March 1968, the period of liberty came to an end. Toeplitz and most of the tutors were fired or left because of political persecution, after supporting protesting students. Toeplitz and moved to Australia in 1970, where he was a founding director of the national film school now known as the Australian Film, Television and Radio School in Sydney.

However, with the advent of Edward Gierek and his regime, the school once again started to bloom.

== Polish Internet Movie Database ==
The Polish Internet Movie Database (Internetowa Baza Filmu Polskiego) has been maintained by the school since 1998.

== Notable alumni ==
The school has four Oscar-winning alumni: Roman Polanski, Andrzej Wajda, Zbigniew Rybczyński, and Hoyte van Hoytema. Alumnus Krzysztof Kieślowski was nominated for an Oscar, but did not win. Both Polanski and Wajda won the Palme d'Or at the Cannes Film Festival in 2002 and 1981, respectively.

=== Directors ===
- Feliks Falk
- Dariusz Gajewski
- Wojciech Has
- Kazimierz Karabasz
- Dorota Kędzierzawska
- Jan Kidawa-Błoński
- Krzysztof Kieślowski, nominated for an Academy Award, Golden Lion winner
- Janusz Kijowski
- Jan Komasa, nominated for an Academy Award
- Grzegorz Królikiewicz
- Kazimierz Kutz
- Jan Łomnicki
- Jan Machulski
- Juliusz Machulski
- Andrzej Munk
- Janusz Nasfeter
- Władysław Pasikowski
- Radosław Piwowarski
- Marek Piwowski
- Roman Polanski, Academy Award, BAFTA Award, Golden Globe and Palme d'Or winner
- Bohdan Poręba
- Wojciech Kasperski
- Barbara Sass
- Jerzy Skolimowski, Palme d'Or winner and Golden Bear winner
- Piotr Szulkin
- Piotr Trzaskalski
- Andrzej Wajda, Academy Award, BAFTA Award, Golden Bear and Palme d'Or winner
- Maciej Wojtyszko
- Krzysztof Zanussi, Golden Lion winner
- Emily Young, BAFTA Award winner
- Maria Sadowska
- Urszula Urbaniak
- Mostafa Derkaoui
- Abdelkarim Derkaoui

=== Cinematographers ===
- Andrzej Bartkowiak
- Wit Dąbal
- Jolanta Dylewska
- Michał Dymek
- Paweł Edelman, nominated for an Academy Award and BAFTA Award
- Magdalena Górka
- Hoyte van Hoytema, Academy Award and BAFTA Award winner
- Sławomir Idziak, nominated for an Academy Award
- Edward Kłosiński
- Jan Jakub Kolski
- Piotr Lenar
- Jerzy Lipman
- Tomasz Naumiuk
- Jacek Petrycki
- Krzysztof Ptak
- Arthur Reinhart
- Zbigniew Rybczyński, Academy Award winner
- Adam Sikora
- Przemysław Skwirczyński
- Michał Sobociński
- Piotr Sobociński, nominated for an Academy Award
- Piotr Sobociński Jr.
- Witold Sobociński
- Wojciech Staroń
- Dariusz Wolski, nominated for an Academy Award
- Hubert Taczanowski
- Arkadiusz Tomiak
- Łukasz Żal, nominated for two Academy Awards, winner of the ASC award

=== Actors ===
- Artur Barciś
- Szymon Bobrowski
- Barbara Brylska
- Ireneusz Czop
- Małgorzata Foremniak
- Janusz Gajos
- Tomasz Konieczny
- Weronika Książkiewicz
- Jerzy Matuszkiewicz (jazz musician)
- Cezary Pazura
- Beata Pozniak
- Pola Raksa
- Zbigniew Zamachowski

=== Editors ===
- Agnieszka Glińska
- Rafał Listopad

== Rectors ==
Source.

- 1952–1957 – Roman Ożogowski (as director)
- 1957–1968 – Jerzy Toeplitz
- 1968–1969 – Bolesław Lewicki
- 1969–1972 – Jerzy Kotowski
- 1972–1980 – Stanisław Kuszewski
- 1980–1982 – Roman Wajdowicz
- 1982–1990 – Henryk Kluba
- 1990–1996 – Wojciech Jerzy Has
- 1996–2002 – Henryk Kluba
- 2002–2008 – Jerzy Antoni Woźniak
- 2008–2012 – Robert Gliński
- 2012–2020 – Mariusz Grzegorzek
- From 2020 – Milenia Fiedler

== See also ==
- Cinema of Poland
- Film Polski
- Polish Film School
- New York Polish Film Festival
- Seattle Polish Film Festival
- Analog photography
- Digital versus film photography
- History of cinema
- List of famous Poles
- List of film festivals
- List of film formats
- List of film techniques
- List of motion picture-related topics (Extensive alphabetical listing and glossary).
- List of photographic processes
- List of video-related topics
- Outline of film
