= Cold Case season 4 =

Cold Case
- Season 4
- No. of episodes: 24

Release
- Original network: CBS
- Original release: September 24, 2006 – May 6, 2007

Season chronology
- ← Previous; Season 3 Next → Season 5

The fourth season of Cold Case, an American television series, began airing on CBS on September 24, 2006 and concluded on May 6, 2007. Season four regular cast members include Kathryn Morris, Danny Pino, John Finn, Thom Barry, Jeremy Ratchford and Tracie Thoms. This is the only season of the series to feature 24 episodes.

During this season before the season finale "Stalker", Danny Pino guest-starred as his character Scotty Valens in an episode of CSI: NY, also produced by Jerry Bruckheimer.

== Cast ==
Actor	Character	Main cast	Recurring cast
Kathryn Morris	Det. Lilly Rush	entire season	—N/a
Danny Pino	Det. Scotty Valens	entire season	—N/a
John Finn	Lt. John Stillman	entire season	—N/a
Thom Barry	Det. Will Jeffries	entire season	—N/a
Jeremy Ratchford	Det. Nick Vera	entire season	—N/a
Tracie Thoms	Det. Kat Miller	entire season	—N/a
Susan Chuang	Dr. Frannie Ching	—N/a	episodes 4, 12, 17
Bonnie Root	ADA Alexandra Thomas	—N/a	episodes 7, 19, 22, 24
Doug Spinuzza	Louie Amante	—N/a	episode 15

== Episodes ==
No. overall	No. in season	Title	Directed by	Written by	Original release date	Prod. code	US viewers (millions)
70	1	"Rampage"	Mark Pellington	Veena Cabreros Sud	September 24, 2006	2T7901	16.27
The team reinvestigates a 1995 shopping mall massacre committed by two 16-year-old boys and best friends, Neal Halon and Cameron Coulter, who committed suicide at the scene, after the discovery of a video camera left in an air shaft points to a third shooter.: Song featured in the intro: "I Will Refuse", by Pailhead; Song featured in the finale: "One of Us", by Joan Osborne.
71	2	"The War at Home"	Alex Zakrzewski	Samantha Howard Corbin	October 1, 2006	2T7904	14.44
The team reexamines the circumstances surrounding the 2004 disappearance of Iraq War veteran Dana Taylor after the Philadelphia Police Department's Marine Unit finds her prosthetic arm during a trawl of the Delaware River.: Song featured in the intro: "White Houses", by Vanessa Carlton.; Song featured in the finale: "Little By Little", by Oasis.
72	3	"Sandhogs"	David Von Ancken	Greg Plageman	October 8, 2006	2T7903	13.73
The team reexamines the circumstances surrounding the 1948 disappearance of sandhog miner John "Boomer" Donovan after workers find his remains during renovations of a subway service tunnel.: Song featured in the intro: "Sixteen Tons", by Big Bill Broonzy.; Song featured in the finale: "I Wonder", by Louis Armstrong.
73	4	"Baby Blues"	David Barrett	Liz W. Garcia	October 15, 2006	2T7902	13.97
The team reexamines the 1982 death of newborn Iris Felice, originally termed as Sudden Infant Death Syndrome, when new evidence suggests she may have been murdered.: Song featured in the intro: "Somebody's Baby", by Jackson Browne.; Song featured in the finale: "Open Arms", by Journey.
74	5	"Saving Sammy"	Paris Barclay	Tyler Bensinger	October 22, 2006	2T7905	14.81
The team reopens the 2003 double murder of married couple Steve and Lisa Harris at the request of Joseph Shaw, who believes their autistic son might have witnessed the crime.: Song featured in the intro: "Calling All Angels", by Train.; Song featured in the finale: "In My Place", by Coldplay.
75	6	"Static"	Kevin Bray	Gavin Harris	October 29, 2006	2T7906	14.16
The team reopens the 1958 death of disc jockey John "The Hawk" Hawkins after discovering audio evidence indicating that his death may have been a murder staged as suicide.: Song featured in the finale: "Scarlet Rose", performed by Alexa Khan and written by Gary Haase.
76	7	"The Key"	David Barrett	Jennifer M. Johnson	November 5, 2006	2T7907	13.96
The team reopens the 1979 murder of Libby Bradley, an upper-class schoolteacher, wife, and mother, when her bloodstained jacket is found in a tree in the woods where she was stabbed to death. The team soon discovers that the victim was having marital problems with her husband Carl that affected even their daughter Helen, whom Jefferies had promised that he would catch her mother's killer.: Song featured in the intro: "Best of My Love", by The Emotions.; Song featured in the finale: "Broken Hearted Me", by Anne Murray.
77	8	"Fireflies"	Marcos Siega	Erica Shelton	November 12, 2006	2T7908	14.77
The team reopens the 1975 case of Melanie Campbell, a missing 8-year-old girl, after an undelivered letter of hers is found. The team sets out to determine the fate of the girl, and in doing so, delves deep into her controversial friendship with her African-American neighbor and the racial tensions in her neighborhood.: Song featured in the intro: "Tin Man", by America; Song featured in the finale: "Landslide", by Fleetwood Mac.
78	9	"Lonely Hearts"	John Peters	Liz W. Garcia	November 19, 2006	2T7909	14.53
The team reexamines the 1989 murder of mortuary assistant Martha Puck, originally considered a mugging gone wrong, after a known con artist commits suicide while watching a video dating tape she made.: Song featured in the intro: "The Look", by Roxette.; Song featured in the finale: "Alone", by Heart.
79	10	"Forever Blue"	Jeannot Szwarc	Tom Pettit	December 3, 2006	2T7910	14.11
The team reopens the 1968 murder of Sean Cooper, a young policeman with a "cowboy" reputation who was shot to death in his patrol car, after a terminally ill convict claims the cop was crooked. The case takes a shocking turn after the team learns that the victim was having an affair with his partner.: Song featured in the intro: "Daydream Believer", by The Monkees.; Song featured in the finale: "My Back Pages", by The Byrds.
80	11	"The Red and the Blue"	Steve Boyum	Meredith Stiehm	December 10, 2006	2T7911	14.05
The team reopens the 2000 murder of Truck Sugar, a country singer who was on the cusp of his big break, after the murder weapon turns up. Lilly must travel to Tennessee with a reluctant Scotty in tow to reinvestigate the case.: All songs featured in this episode are performed by Tim McGraw.; Song featured in the intro: "Just to See You Smile", by Tim McGraw.; Song featured in the finale: "I've Got Friends That Do", by Tim McGraw.
81	12	"Knuckle Up"	David Barrett	Greg Plageman	January 7, 2007	2T7912	14.12
The team reexamines the circumstances surrounding the 2006 disappearance of prep school student James Hoffman at the request of his younger sister Alexa, who recently found an Internet video of him participating in an underground fight club.: Song featured in the intro: "Chariot", by Gavin DeGraw.; Song featured in the finale: "How to Save a Life", by The Fray.
82	13	"Blackout"	Seith Mann	Tyler Bensinger	January 14, 2007	2T7913	14.53
The team reopens the 1996 death of divorcee Lauren Williams, originally considered an accidental drowning in her ex-husband's swimming pool, after the house's new owner finds one of her fingernails underneath the diving board.: Song featured in the intro: "One Headlight", by The Wallflowers.; Song featured in the finale: "Name" by Goo Goo Dolls.
83	14	"8:03 AM"	Alex Zakrzewski	Veena Cabreros Sud	January 28, 2007	2T7914	15.13
The team reopens the 2002 shooting deaths of teenage drug dealer Skill Jones and private school student Madison Reed after Kat, who met Skill while working undercover, discovers they were both killed on the same day.: All songs featured in this episode were performed by U2.; Song featured in the intro: "Beautiful Day", by U2.; Song featured in the finale: "With or Without You", by U2.
84	15	"Blood on the Tracks"	Kevin Bray	Gavin Harris	February 18, 2007	2T7915	11.60
The team reexamines the 1981 deaths of married anti-war activists Jack and Johanna Kimball, originally considered an accidental gas leak explosion, after workers find pipe bomb fragments during remodeling of their former home.: All songs featured in this episode are performed by Bob Dylan.; Song featured in the intro: "The Times They Are A-Changin'", by Bob Dylan.; Song featured in the finale: "Like a Rolling Stone", by Bob Dylan.
85	16	"The Good-Bye Room"	Holly Dale	Jennifer M. Johnson	March 4, 2007	2T7916	13.14
The team reopens the 1964 murder of Hillary West, a 17-year-old girl and young mother who was killed hours after giving birth to a baby girl in a church-run home for unwed mothers.: Song featured in the intro: "Baby Love", by The Supremes.; Song featured in the finale: "You Are My Sunshine", by Carly Simon.
86	17	"Shuffle, Ball Change"	Mark Pellington	Liz W. Garcia	March 11, 2007	2T7917	15.45
The team reexamines the circumstances surrounding the 1984 disappearance of teenage grocery clerk and aspiring dancer Maurice Hall after workers find his remains during a landfill excavation.: Song featured in the intro: "Heat of the Moment", by Asia.; Song featured in the finale: "I Want to Know What Love Is", by Foreigner.
87	18	"A Dollar, a Dream"	Chris Fisher	Erica Shelton	March 18, 2007	2T7918	15.09
The team reopens the 1999 disappearance of Marlene Bradford, a widowed mother of two, after a station wagon containing her bones is found at the bottom of a lake.: Song featured in the intro: "Home" by Sheryl Crow.; Song featured in the finale: "Angel", by Sarah McLachlan.
88	19	"Offender"	David Barrett	Greg Plageman	March 25, 2007	2T7919	13.91
The team reopens the 1987 rape and murder of 6-year-old Clayton Hathaway after his father Mitch, who was convicted of the crime, is released and pushes a sex offender from the roof of a building, vowing to systematically kill a new offender each day until his son's real killer is found.: Song featured in the intro: "Bizarre Love Triangle", by New Order.; Song featured in the finale: "Never Surrender", by Corey Hart.
89	20	"Stand Up and Holler"	John Peters	Kate Purdy	April 1, 2007	2T7920	13.23
The team reexamines the 1997 death of cheerleader Rainey Karlsen, originally considered a drug overdose, at the request of her mother, who recently found an anonymous confession to her murder in a modern art exhibit.: Song featured in the intro: "Plowed", by Sponge.; Song featured in the finale: "High and Dry", by Radiohead.
90	21	"Torn"	Kevin Bray	Tyler Bensinger	April 8, 2007	2T7921	11.33
The team reopens the 1919 murder of Frances Stone, an 18-year-old heiress, at the request of her great-grand-niece, who heard about Lilly from a women's studies lecture.: Song featured in the intro: "Alexander's Ragtime Band", sung by Bessie Smith.; Song featured in the finale: "Stardust", by Hoagy Carmichael.
91	22	"Cargo"	Andy García	Tom Pettit	April 15, 2007	2T7922	12.20
The team reopens the 2005 murder of longshoreman Mike Chulaski at the request of ADA Alexandra Thomas, who believes that solving the case can help the FBI take down the puppetmaster of an international human trafficking ring.: Song featured in the intro: "Maybe Tomorrow", by Stereophonics.; Song featured in the finale: "Fix You", by Coldplay.
92	23	"The Good Death"	Paris Barclay	Gavin Harris	April 29, 2007	2T7923	12.14
The team reopens the 1998 murder of Jay Dratton, a terminally ill businessman, after one of his nurses confesses to six incidents of mercy killing.: Song featured in the intro: "1979", by The Smashing Pumpkins; Song featured in the finale: "Good Day", by Paul Westerberg.
93	24	"Stalker"	Alex Zakrzewski	Veena Cabreros Sud & Liz W. Garcia	May 6, 2007	2T7924	13.70
The team reopens the 2006 murder/suicide of the Jacobi family when the sole survivor of the shooting, the teenage daughter, wakes from a coma and reveals that her father was not the shooter.: Song featured in the intro: "Speed of Sound", by Coldplay.; Song featured in the finale: "Stolen", by Dashboard Confessional.
