= Cold Case season 2 =

Cold Case
- Season 2
- No. of episodes: 23

Release
- Original network: CBS
- Original release: October 3, 2004 – May 22, 2005

Season chronology
- ← Previous; Season 1 Next → Season 3

The second season of Cold Case, an American television series, began airing on CBS on October 3, 2004 and concluded on May 22, 2005. Season two regular cast members include Kathryn Morris, Danny Pino, John Finn, Thom Barry and Jeremy Ratchford.

== Cast ==
Actor	Character	Main cast	Recurring cast
Kathryn Morris	Det. Lilly Rush	entire season	—N/a
Danny Pino	Det. Scotty Valens	entire season	—N/a
John Finn	Lt. John Stillman	entire season	—N/a
Thom Barry	Det. Will Jeffries	entire season	—N/a
Jeremy Ratchford	Det. Nick Vera	entire season	—N/a
Susan Chuang	Dr. Frannie Ching	—N/a	episodes 4, 9, 14, 18, 22
Josh Hopkins	ADA Jason Kite	—N/a	episode 1
Sonya Leslie	Det. Lennie Desalle	—N/a	episode 23

== Episodes ==
No. overall	No. in season	Title	Directed by	Written by	Original release date	Prod. code	US viewers (millions)
24	1	"The Badlands"	Tim Matheson	Chris Mundy	October 3, 2004	177751	15.03
The team reopens the 2003 triple murder of married restaurant owners Tom and Della Lincoln and their employee Derek Jackson (Note: As depicted in S1E1 Look Again) after the prime suspect's lawyer provides an alibi for the night the killings took place.: Song featured in the intro: "Still Fly" by Big Tymers; Song featured in the finale: "If I Ain't Got You" by Alicia Keys.
25	2	"Factory Girls"	David Von Ancken	Story by : Stacy Kravetz; Teleplay by : Meredith Stiehm	October 10, 2004	177755	15.50
The team investigates the 1943 death of factory worker Alice Miller after her great-niece, a newspaper reporter and a friend of Lilly's, meets former colleagues who voice suspicions about a possible cover-up.: Song featured in the intro: "Rosie the Riveter" by Four Vagabonds; Song featured in the finale: "Don't Fence Me In" by Bing Crosby and The Andrews Sisters.
26	3	"Daniela"	David Barrett	Veena Cabreros Sud	October 17, 2004	177752	15.68
The team examines the 1979 death of an unidentified teenage runaway after a battered wife accuses her husband of murder and turns over a snuff film that presumably features him committing the crime.: Song featured in the intro: "Bad Girls" by Donna Summer.; Song featured in the finale: "Goodbye Girl" by David Gates.
27	4	"The House"	Alex Zakrzewski	Sean Whitesell	October 24, 2004	177753	15.38
The team reinvestigates the circumstances surrounding the 1968 murder of convict Hank Dempsey after human remains are found in a tunnel leading out of the state penitentiary where he served his sentence.: All songs featured in this episode were performed by Johnny Cash.; Song featured in the intro: "Folsom Prison Blues" by Johnny Cash.; Song featured in the finale: "Flesh and Blood" by Johnny Cash.
28	5	"Who's Your Daddy?"	Greg Yaitanes	Tyler Bensinger	October 31, 2004	177754	16.20
The team reopens the 1991 double murder of illegal Cambodian immigrants Sen and Channary Dhiet at the request of their daughter Kara, who witnessed the crime and recently found an Internet auction listing for her mother's gold bracelet.: Song featured in the intro: "Sadeness", by Enigma.; Song featured in the finale: "Send Me an Angel", by Scorpions.
29	6	"The Sleepover"	Emilio Estevez	Liz W. Garcia	November 7, 2004	177757	17.66
The team reexamines the 1990 death of scholarship student Rita Baxter, originally termed an accidental drowning at a local swimming hole, when a young woman's body is discovered at the same location.: Song featured in the intro: "Stand" by R.E.M.; Song featured in the finale: "Circle" by Edie Brickell.
30	7	"It's Raining Men"	Paul Holahan	Jan Oxenberg	November 14, 2004	177756	18.43
The team reopens the 1983 murder of 25-year-old Jeff Kern at the request of his former lover, an AIDS survivor, who hopes to find closure before his upcoming wedding. The team learns that the victim's relationship with his family and friends was strained due to his outspoken views on gay rights and the AIDS crisis.: Song featured in the intro: "It's Raining Men", by The Weather Girls; Song featured in the finale: "When I'm with You", by Sheriff.
31	8	"Red Glare"	Tim Matheson	Jay Beattie & Dan Dworkin	November 21, 2004	177758	15.58
A troubled man asks the team to reopen the 1953 murder of his father, Elliot Garvey, a schoolteacher who was killed the same day that the Rosenbergs were executed, after learning that his mother lied about who he was. The team learns that the teacher was suspected of holding communist views due to his support for civil rights in schools and was slated to testify before the House Un-American Activities Committee shortly before his death.: Song featured in the intro: "Your Mouth's Got A Hole In It" by Buddy Morrow; Song featured in the finale: "I Believe", by Frankie Laine.
32	9	"Mind Hunters"	Kevin Bray	Veena Cabreros Sud	November 28, 2004	177759	17.51
The team begins the hunt for a serial killer when the reinvestigation of 31-year-old mother and wife Janet Lambert's disappearance in 1985 leads to the discovery of eight more victims, all of whom were found decapitated.: Song featured in the intro: "Only the Young", by Journey.; Song featured in the finale: "Long, Long Way To Go", by Phil Collins.
33	10	"Discretion"	James Whitmore, Jr.	Henry Robles	December 19, 2004	177760	14.81
The team reinvestigates the 2000 murder of New Haven, Connecticut prosecutor Greg Vizcaino at the request of his widow, who is determined to disprove embezzlement allegations made by a former colleague.: Song featured in the intro: "Kryptonite", by 3 Doors Down.; Song featured in the finale: "Why Does It Always Rain On Me?", by Travis.
34	11	"Blank Generation"	David Barrett	Chris Mundy	January 9, 2005	177761	15.57
The team reopens the 1978 murder of Matthew Adams, a 20-year-old medical student turned cult member whose death was ruled a suicide, after his sister brings forward new evidence linking him and the cult to a recent homicide. The investigation soon uncovers dark secrets from both the cult and the victim's family.: Song featured in the intro: "Surrender", by Cheap Trick; Song featured in the finale: "(What's So Funny 'Bout) Peace, Love and Understanding?", by Elvis Costello.
35	12	"Yo, Adrian"	James Whitmore, Jr.	Sean Whitesell	January 16, 2005	177762	15.67
The team reopens the 1976 murder of Jerry Stone, a 24-year-old underdog boxer who died during a match, after a referee on his deathbed confesses to having been paid to allow the match to turn deadly, but dies before he can give a name.: Song featured in the intro: "Philadelphia Freedom, by Elton John; Song featured in the finale: "Baby, I Love Your Way", by Peter Frampton.
36	13	"Time to Crime"	Tim Hunter	Tyler Bensinger	January 30, 2005	177763	16.69
The team reopens the 1987 murder of Kayla Odoms, a 6-year-old girl who was killed in a drive-by shooting, when the long-lost murder weapon is turned in as part of a gun buyback program. The team begins the daunting task of tracing the gun back to its previous owners in an effort to find the original shooter.: Song featured in the intro: "Higher Love", by Steve Winwood.; Song featured in the finale: "Man in the Mirror", by Michael Jackson.
37	14	"Revolution"	Alex Zakrzewski	Liz W. Garcia	February 20, 2005	177764	15.41
The team reopens the 1969 murder of 19-year-old Ellie McCormick after the number one suspect, a fugitive draft dodger and her boyfriend, is arrested on his return from Canada. But the team's investigation leads them down new avenues that suggest the boyfriend was framed, as well as the pressures of being drafted during the Vietnam War.: Song featured in the intro: "Do You Believe in Magic", by The Lovin' Spoonful.; Song featured in the finale: "I Say a Little Prayer", by Aretha Franklin.
38	15	"Wishing"	Emilio Estevez	Karin Lewicki	March 6, 2005	177765	15.77
The team reopens the 1993 death of Colin Miller, a mentally disabled teenager who was hit by a train, when drawings of his death are found next to his grave, implying he might have actually been murdered. The team learns that the victim had a turbulent home and school life.: Song featured in the intro: "These Are Days", by 10,000 Maniacs.; Song featured in the finale: "Somewhere Over the Rainbow", by Israel Kamakawiwo'ole.
39	16	"Revenge"	David Von Ancken	Dan Dworkin & Jay Beattie	March 13, 2005	177766	16.61
The team reexamines the 1998 death of kidnapping victim Kyle Bream after Stillman's brother receives a deathbed confession from a man involved in the kidnapping.: Song featured in the intro: "The Impression That I Get", by The Mighty Mighty Bosstones.; Song featured in the finale: "Don't Go Away", by Oasis
40	17	"Schadenfreude"	Tim Matheson	Gina Gionfriddo	March 20, 2005	177767	17.29
The team reexamines the 1982 death of socialite Lindsay Chase, whose financially struggling husband was convicted of the crime, after her husband's ring is found on the finger of a deceased heroin addict.: Song featured in the intro: "Under Pressure", by David Bowie ft. Queen.; Song featured in the finale: "Don't Stop Believin'", by Journey.
41	18	"Ravaged"	James Whitmore, Jr.	Meredith Stiehm & Henry Robles	March 27, 2005	177769	13.24
The team reopens the 1995 death of 32-year-old Sloane Easton, a young mother and struggling alcoholic whose death was ruled "accidental", after the victim's sister learns that a group of college students may have accosted her on the night of her death.: Song featured in the intro: "As I Lay Me Down", by Sophie B. Hawkins.; Song featured in the finale: "Secret Garden", by Bruce Springsteen.
42	19	"Strange Fruit"	Paris Barclay	Veena Cabreros Sud	April 3, 2005	177768	14.84
Haunted by a childhood memory, Jeffries asks Lilly to help him reexamine the 1963 murder of Zeke Williams, a 16-year-old African-American boy who was found dead in a playground. When it is discovered his family had moved into a predominantly white neighborhood prior to his death, the team investigates the possible racial tensions surrounding his death.: Song featured in the intro: "One Fine Day", by The Chiffons; Song featured in the finale: "Strange Fruit", by Nina Simone.
43	20	"Kensington"	Bill Eagles	Sean Whitesell	April 24, 2005	177770	16.74
The team investigates the 1985 death of mill worker Joe Young when his nephew James, a convict whom Lilly arrested for covering up his grandmother's murder (Note: As depicted in S1.E9 Sherry Darlin'), claims he met a recent parolee who admitted to stealing money off Joe's body.: All songs featured in this episode are performed by John Mellencamp.; Song featured in the intro: "Jack and Diane" by John Mellencamp.; Song featured in the finale: "Small Town" by John Mellencamp.
44	21	"Creatures of the Night"	Alex Zakrzewski	Tyler Bensinger	May 1, 2005	177771	16.28
The team reopens the 1977 murder of Mike Cahill, a hotel doorman, in the hopes of linking a soon-to-be-released serial killer, Roy Brigham Anthony, to the murder in order to prevent him from walking free.: Song featured in the intro: "Time Warp", by Charles Gray, Patricia Quinn, Nell Campbell and Richard O'Brien.; Song featured in the finale: "Over at the Frankenstein Place", by Susan Sarandon, Barry Bostwick and Richard O'Brien.
45	22	"Best Friends"	Mark Pellington	Liz W. Garcia	May 8, 2005	177772	14.77
When an old truck containing human bones is pulled from the Delaware River, the team reopens the 1932 case of Billie Duccette, a missing 17-year-old girl who was presumed dead. The team discovers that the truck was owned by a Prohibition-era bootlegger and that the victim may have been involved in a forbidden love affair.: Song featured in the intro: "I Got Rhythm", by Ethel Waters with Ben Slavin.; Song featured in the finale: "Best Friends" by Michael Levine.
46	23	"The Woods"	Nelson McCormick	Veena Cabreros Sud	May 22, 2005	177773	14.60
The discovery of nine human skulls leads the team back to serial killer George Marks, whom they were unable to incriminate months earlier. When the detectives decide to reinvestigate the murder of his mother, 33-year-old Simone Marks, in 1972, Marks emerges from hiding to face Det. Rush one-on-one.: Song featured in the intro: "Sunshine on My Shoulders", by John Denver.; Song featured in the finale: "Behind Blue Eyes", by The Who.
