= Cold Case season 3 =

Cold Case
- Season 3
- No. of episodes: 23

Release
- Original network: CBS
- Original release: September 25, 2005 – May 21, 2006

Season chronology
- ← Previous; Season 2 Next → Season 4

The third season of Cold Case, an American television series, began airing on CBS on September 25, 2005, and concluded on May 21, 2006. Season three regular cast members include Kathryn Morris, Danny Pino, John Finn, Thom Barry and Jeremy Ratchford. From episode 8 onwards, Tracie Thoms joins the main cast as Det. Kat Miller.

== Cast ==
Actor	Character	Main cast	Recurring cast
Kathryn Morris	Det. Lilly Rush	entire season	—N/a
Danny Pino	Det. Scotty Valens	entire season	—N/a
John Finn	Lt. John Stillman	entire season	—N/a
Thom Barry	Det. Will Jeffries	entire season	—N/a
Jeremy Ratchford	Det. Nick Vera	entire season	—N/a
Tracie Thoms	Det. Kat Miller	episodes 12–23	episodes 8, 9, 10
Susan Chuang	Dr. Frannie Ching	—N/a	episodes 5, 9
Sarah Brown	Det. Josie Sutton	—N/a	episodes 1–5
Josh Hopkins	ADA Jason Kite	—N/a	episode 19

== Episodes ==
No. overall	No. in season	Title	Directed by	Written by	Original release date	Prod. code	US viewers (millions)
47	1	"Family"	Mark Pellington	Meredith Stiehm	September 25, 2005	2T6-352	13.68
The team reopens the 1988 murder of Jimmy Tate, an 18-year-old high school student and young father who was killed in a hit-and-run accident on graduation night, after his daughter is contacted by a man claiming to be her biological father.: Song featured in the intro: "Always On My Mind", by Pet Shop Boys.; Song featured in the finale: "In Your Eyes", by Peter Gabriel.
48	2	"The Promise"	Paris Barclay	Veena Cabreros Sud	October 2, 2005	2T6-353	16.67
The team reopens the 2004 murder of Laurie Dunne, an 18-year-old college student who died of suffocation in a fraternity house fire after her widowed father presents evidence suggesting her death was not accidental. The team discovers that the young woman was targeted by fraternity members due to being overweight.: Song featured in the intro: "Hey Ya!", by Outkast; Song featured in the finale: "Fallen", by Sarah McLachlan.
49	3	"Bad Night"	Kevin Bray	Andrea Newman	October 9, 2005	2T6-354	15.88
The team reopens the 1978 murder of Angus Bistrong, a 21-year-old college student who was stabbed to death and his body left in front of a movie theater after his mother finds a letter suggesting that his death wasn't random. The team discovers that many of his friends blamed him for a car accident that left their other friend disabled.: Song featured in the intro: "American Girl", by Tom Petty and the Heartbreakers.; Song featured in the finale: "Dream On", by Aerosmith.
50	4	"Colors"	Paris Barclay	Sean Whitesell	October 16, 2005	2T6-351	14.15
Encouraged by Jefferies’ nephew, the team reopens the 1945 murder of Clyde Taylor, a 20-year-old Negro League baseball player who was beaten to death with his own bat.: Song featured in the intro: "Baseball Boogie", by Mabel Scott; Song featured in the finale: "Sentimental Journey", by Doris Day.
51	5	"Committed"	Alex Zakrzewski	Liz W. Garcia	October 23, 2005	2T6-355	14.95
When it is discovered that a recently deceased elderly woman had been using someone else's identity for decades, the team reopens the 1954 death of Bettie Petrowski, a housewife who was committed to a mental institution after nearly burning her son in a house fire.: Song featured in the intro: "Sh-Boom", by The Crew-Cuts; Song featured in the finale: "Only You (And You Alone)", by The Platters.
52	6	"Saving Patrick Bubley"	Marcos Siega	Tyler Bensinger	November 6, 2005	2T6-357	16.62
After Maeve Bubley, a mother of five boys loses her fourth son to gang violence, the team reopens the 1999 murder of her first son, Vaughn, one of Rush's first cases as a homicide detective, along with the murders of her three other sons: Cedric in 2001, Quincy in 2003, and the most recent, Luther in 2005. The team is determined to track down the killer of the mother's first four sons in order to save her last remaining one, Patrick.: Song featured in the intro: "Changes", by 2Pac.; Song featured in the finale: "Faith in You", by P. M. Dawn.
53	7	"Start-Up"	James Whitmore Jr.	Karin Lewicki	November 13, 2005	2T6-356	17.42
The team reinvestigates the 1999 death of Amy Lind, a young, healthy woman who seemingly died of a heart attack, after a death threat addressed to her is found on the hard drive of an old computer. The team discovers that the victim was briefly a millionaire during the dot-com boom, but her company went under due to her partner's indulgent behavior and an investor's unscrupulous practices.: Song featured in the intro: "You Get What You Give", by The New Radicals; Song featured in the finale: "Save Me", by Aimee Mann.
54	8	"Honor"	Paris Barclay	Craig Turk	November 20, 2005	2T6-358	17.08
The team reopens the 1973 murder of US Navy pilot and Vietnam War veteran Carl Burton after Narcotics detective Kat Miller finds a box filled with POW support bracelets in an abandoned drug house.: Song featured in the intro: "Rocket Man", by Elton John.; Song featured in the finale: "If You Could Read My Mind", by Gordon Lightfoot.
55	9	"A Perfect Day"	Roxann Dawson	Veena Cabreros Sud	November 27, 2005	2T6-359	19.37
The team reopens the 1965 disappearance of Vivian Mulvaney, a 4-year-old girl after her remains wash up on a New Jersey shore. The team discovers that she came from an abusive household, and their investigation uncovers the domestic violence that took place in her home.: Song featured in the intro: "My Girl", by The Temptations.; Song featured in the finale: "Catch the Wind", by Donovan
56	10	"Frank's Best"	Michael Schultz	Andrea Newman	December 18, 2005	2T6-360	15.22
The team re-opens the 2001 murder of Frank DiCenzio, a 49-year-old widowed deli owner, when the brother of the man convicted of the murder brings forth new evidence suggesting that his brother may be innocent. The team discovers that the victim had a rocky personal life following the death of his wife.: Song featured in the intro: "Santa Claus Is Comin' to Town", by Steve Tyrell; Song featured in the finale: "Wherever You Will Go", by The Calling.
57	11	"8 Years"	Mark Pellington	Meredith Stiehm	January 8, 2006	2T6-361	15.95
The team reopens the 1988 murder of Clem Garris after receiving an anonymous tip related to his murder. The top suspects include three of the victim's old friends who had parted ways after graduating from high school eight years before his death.: All songs in this episode are by Bruce Springsteen.; Song featured in the intro: "No Surrender", by Bruce Springsteen.; Song featured in the finale: "One Step Up", by Bruce Springsteen.
58	12	"Detention"	Jessica Landaw	Liz W. Garcia	January 15, 2006	2T6-362	14.61
The team reopens the 1994 death of Trevor Dawson, a 16-year-old boy who was an outcast in school who fell to his death from the roof of his school after serving detention on the same day. The death was originally ruled a suicide, but a newly-found piece of his suicide note indicates that he may have been fearing for his life prior to this death.: Song featured in the intro: "Come Out and Play", by The Offspring.; Song featured in the finale: "Landslide", by The Smashing Pumpkins.
59	13	"Debut"	Tim Hunter	Story by : Karin Lewicki & Kate Purdy; Teleplay by : Karin Lewicki	January 29, 2006	2T6-363	16.51
The team reopens the 1968 death of Emma Vine, an 18-year-old girl who died the night of her debutante ball. The death was originally ruled accidental, but the victim's mother comes forward with new evidence after the wife of the man who had escorted the victim to the ball dies in an identical fashion.: Song featured in the intro: "Hooked on a Feeling", by B. J. Thomas; Song featured in the finale: "Moon River", by Henry Mancini.
60	14	"Dog Day Afternoons"	Craig Ross Jr.	Sean Whitesell	February 26, 2006	2T6-364	14.56
The team reopens the 2000 murder of Roween Ryan, a 30-year-old bank teller who was killed during a robbery, after the same bank is robbed again by perpetrators wearing identical masks and equipped with identical weapons.: Song featured in the intro: "Baby Did a Bad, Bad Thing", by Chris Isaak.; Song featured in the finale: "I Hope You Dance", by Lee Ann Womack.
61	15	"Sanctuary"	Alex Zakrzewski	Steve Sharlet	March 12, 2006	2T6-365	15.05
After a notorious drug dealer is arrested, the team reopens the 1998 murder of Ana Castilla, a Hispanic woman found eviscerated in an alleyway, who had worked for the dealer as a drug mule. The case soon takes a personal turn when the team learns Scotty had a close relationship with Ana prior to her death while he was undercover.: Song featured in the intro: "Teardrop", by Massive Attack.; Song featured in the finale: "Return to Innocence", by Enigma.
62	16	"One Night"	Nicole Kassell	Veena Cabreros Sud	March 19, 2006	2T6-366	14.62
The team reinvestigates the 1980 murder of teenager Steve Jablonski after the killer turns himself in and claims to have struck again.: Song featured in the intro: "Take the Long Way Home", by Supertramp.; Song featured in the finale: "You and Me", by Lifehouse.
63	17	"Superstar"	Bill Eagles	Story by : Craig O'Neill & Jason Tracey and Patricia Fullerton & Nancy Pinkston; Teleplay by : Craig O'Neill & Jason Tracey	March 26, 2006	2T6-367	14.64
The team reexamines the circumstances surrounding the 1973 murder of college tennis star Andi Simmons after her younger sister brings in a poison-soaked towel she discovered among her belongings.: Song featured in the intro: "I Am Woman", by Helen Reddy.; Song featured in the finale: "Your Song", by Elton John.
64	18	"Willkommen"	Paris Barclay	Andrea Newman	April 2, 2006	2T6-368	12.27
The team reexamines the circumstances surrounding the 2002 death of cab driver-turned-actor Dennis Hofferman, originally considered a mugging, after the murder weapon is found lodged inside prop furniture from a local community theater.: Song featured in the intro: "Willkommen" from Cabaret, by Alan Cumming.; Song featured in the finale: "Maybe This Time"/"Cabaret" from Cabaret, by Natasha Richardson.
65	19	"Beautiful Little Fool"	Kevin Bray	Liz W. Garcia	April 9, 2006	2T6-369	13.22
The team reopens the 1929 murder of Violet Polley, a 20-year-old woman and young mother who was found dead in a ravine on Christmas Day, when the victim's great-granddaughter asks the team to finally solve the case in order to clear away the dark cloud hovering over her family.: Song featured in the intro: "Charleston", by Paul Whiteman and his Orchestra; Song featured in the finale: "300 Flowers" by Allison Miller (as Violet). The piece was composed by Michael A. Levine, specifically for this episode.
66	20	"Death Penalty: Final Appeal"	Alex Zakrzewski	Sean Whitesell	April 16, 2006	2T6-370	13.64
The team reopens the 1994 sexual homicide of teenager Kate Lange when the man about to be executed for the crime claims the original investigating detective set him up.: Song featured in the intro: "Shine", by Collective Soul.; Song featured in the finale: "Hallelujah", performed by John Cale, written by Leonard Cohen.
67	21	"The Hen House"	David Von Ancken	Craig Turk	April 30, 2006	2T6-371	14.10
The team reinvestigates the 1945 death of newspaper reporter Lorena Kinney, originally considered a purse snatching gone wrong, after employees at the recently shuttered paper find a letter indicating that she was meeting someone the night she died.: Song featured in the intro: "Leapfrog", by Les Brown and his Orchestra.; Song featured in the finale: "It Could Happen to You", by Jo Stafford.
68	22	"The River"	Craig Ross Jr.	Tyler Bensinger	May 7, 2006	2T6-372	14.61
The team reopens the 1984 murder of Grant Bowen, a respected and beloved ER doctor, after a new witness comes forward saying that he was with a fellow hospital employee just before his death.: Song featured in the intro: "Holding Out for a Hero", by Bonnie Tyler.; Song featured in the finale: "Only Time Will Tell", by Asia.
69	23	"Joseph"	Roxann Dawson	Liz W. Garcia & Andrea Newman	May 21, 2006	2T6-373	13.09
The team reopens the 2005 murder of Joseph Shaw, a drug counselor at a teens' rehab center who was shot to death two weeks before he was scheduled to testify in a murder case, after his credit card is used.: Song featured in the intro: "Float On", by Modest Mouse.; Song featured in the finale: "Collide", by Howie Day.
