= Cold Case season 1 =

Cold Case
- Season 1
- No. of episodes: 23

Release
- Original network: CBS
- Original release: September 28, 2003 – May 23, 2004

Season chronology
- Next → Season 2

The first season of Cold Case, an American television series, aired on CBS from September 28, 2003 to May 23, 2004. Cold Case is a drama about Lilly Rush, an enigmatic and highly effective detective on the Philadelphia Homicide Squad. Rush's instinctive understanding of the criminal mind and her singular passion for uncovering the truth makes her the perfect fit for investigating cold cases, yester-crimes that have remained unsolved – some only a few months old, others going back decades. Rush and her team use their wits to take on aging evidence and witnesses with buried secrets, uncovering fresh clues, digging into old wounds and doggedly pursuing the truth. The first episode focuses on Rush finding passions for opening cold cases, and throughout the season gaining more and more passion, making cold cases her main job within the Homicide Unit. Initially, Rush is partnered with Chris Lassing (Justin Chambers). Lassing's character left the show after episode 4 because of health reasons. Justin Chambers, who played Lassing, left the show to star as Alex Karev in ABC's hit drama show Grey's Anatomy. Scotty Valens (Danny Pino) was assigned as Rush's new partner in episode six and continued throughout the series. Alongside them is Will Jeffries (Thom Barry), a long-time detective, Nick Vera (Jeremy Ratchford), a rough around the edges cop, and Lieutenant John Stillman (John Finn), a gentle yet caring boss who always plays by the rules. Recurring in this season, starting from episode 6 is Josh Hopkins, playing ADA Jason Kite, who eventually grew into a relationship for Rush as the season progressed.

== Characters ==
Actor	Character	Main cast	Recurring cast
Kathryn Morris	Det. Lilly Rush	entire season	—N/a
Danny Pino	Det. Scotty Valens	episodes 6-8 & 10–23	—N/a
John Finn	Lt. John Stillman	entire season	—N/a
Thom Barry	Det. Will Jeffries	entire season	—N/a
Jeremy Ratchford	Det. Nick Vera	entire season	—N/a
Justin Chambers	Det. Chris Lassing	episodes 1–4	absent in episode 3
Doug Spinuzza	Louie Amante	—N/a	episodes 2, 16
Josh Hopkins	ADA Jason Kite	—N/a	episodes 6, 11, 12, 13, 15, 19, 20, 23
Ameenah Kaplan	Leticia Castillo	—N/a	episode 15
Susan Chuang	Dr. Frannie Ching	—N/a	episode 21
Kevin McCorkle	Det. Gil Sherman	—N/a	episode 4, 6, 18

== Episodes ==
No. overall	No. in season	Title	Directed by	Written by	Original release date	Prod. code	US viewers (millions)
1	1	"Look Again"	Mark Pellington	Meredith Stiehm	September 28, 2003	475195	15.85
Detective Lilly Rush from Philadelphia Homicide force is transferred to the Cold Case Unit. She kicks off her career as a Cold Case detective by reopening the 1976 murder of Jill Shelby, a 15-year-old girl who was found beaten to death at a party hosted by her wealthy neighbors, one of them being her boyfriend, after one of the neighbors' former housekeepers comes forward, claiming to have witnessed the murder.: Song featured in the intro: "More Than a Feeling", by Boston; Song featured in the finale: "Have You Ever Seen the Rain", by Creedence Clearwater Revival.
2	2	"Gleen"	Paris Barclay	Jan Oxenberg	October 5, 2003	176702	13.96
The team reinvestigates the 1983 murder of 25-year-old Dana Deamer, a young wife and mother who was killed in an explosion outside her own house while picking up what was supposed to be a box of laundry detergent shortly before she was to testify in court against a man who indecently exposed himself to her in public.: Song featured in intro: "Owner of a Lonely Heart", by Yes; Song featured in the finale: "Straight from the Heart", by Bryan Adams.
3	3	"Our Boy Is Back"	Bryan Spicer	Stacy Kravetz	October 12, 2003	176704	12.82
The team reinvestigates the 1998 murder of college student Gail Chimayo when her killer, a serial rapist who has been inactive for the past five years, sends them a letter announcing his return to Philadelphia and his intentions.: Song featured in the intro: "How's It Going to Be", by Third Eye Blind; Song featured in the finale: "Heroes", by The Wallflowers.
4	4	"Churchgoing People"	Mark Pellington	Meredith Stiehm	October 19, 2003	176701	11.62
The team reinvestigates the 1990 murder of 49-year-old Mitchell Bayes, a church organist, when his Alzheimer's-stricken widow begins having flashbacks from the night he died. The team soon learns dark secrets about the family that could lead them to the killer.: Song featured in the intro: "Faith", by George Michael; Song featured in the finale: "Live to Tell", by Madonna.
5	5	"The Runner"	David Straiton	Veena Cabreros Sud	October 26, 2003	176703	13.37
When a drug addict brings in an audio tape capturing the recording of a fatal shooting, the team reopens the 1973 murder of a young police officer, 21-year-old Joe Washington, who was killed after responding to a call at a drug-infested housing project. Rush soon discovers several inconsistencies with the statement and fears a dirty cop may have been involved.: Song featured in the intro: "Midnight Train to Georgia", by Gladys Knight & the Pips; Song featured in the finale: "Lean on Me", by Bill Withers.
6	6	"Love Conquers Al"	Greg Yaitanes	Kim Newton	November 9, 2003	176706	14.39
The team reopens the 1981 murder of Paige Pratt, a 16-year-old high school track runner, after a petty crook, hoping to receive a reduced sentence, comes forward claiming to have evidence that her boyfriend, then 21-year-old Al Clarkson was wrongly convicted of her murder. Rush and her new partner, Scotty Valens, get off to a rocky start.: Song featured in the intro: "Keep On Loving You”, by REO Speedwagon; Song featured in the finale: "She's Got a Way", by Billy Joel.
7	7	"A Time to Hate"	Deran Sarafian	Jan Oxenberg	November 16, 2003	176707	13.90
A woman asks Lilly to reinvestigate the unsolved murder of her son Daniel Holtz, a 21-year-old former college baseball player, who was beaten to death outside of a gay bar in 1964 after it was discovered that he was homosexual. Things get personal however, when the team discovers that policemen may have been involved.: Songs features in the intro: "The Shoop Shoop Song (It's in His Kiss)", by Betty Everett / "Remember (Walkin' in the Sand)", by The Shangri-Las.; Song featured in the finale: "Turn! Turn! Turn!", by The Byrds.
8	8	"Fly Away"	James Whitmore, Jr.	Veena Cabreros Sud	November 30, 2003	176708	16.47
The team reinvestigates the 2001 death of 6-year-old Toya Miles, who died after falling through her bedroom window, along with her then 23-year-old mother, Rosie, who survived, but suffered severe head trauma, putting her in a two-year coma. Her recent awakening makes Lilly and the squad try to put the pieces together to determine if this young mother or someone else is responsible for the tragedy.: Song featured in the intro: "Sleep", by Azure Ray; Song featured in the finale: "Heaven (Candlelight Mix)", by DJ Sammy.
9	9	"Sherry Darlin'"	Rachel Talalay	Sean Whitesell	December 7, 2003	176705	15.39
When Lilly receives an anonymous phone call from a man who claims to have killed an elderly woman in 1989, the team investigates the disappearance of Krystal Hogan, an 81-year-old grandmother who went missing that same year. The team discovers that Krystal lived with her orphaned step-grandson, then 19-year-old James Hogan, whose lifestyle she disliked.: Song featured in the intro: "Lovesong", by The Cure; Song featured in the finale: "The End of the Innocence", by Don Henley feat. Bruce Hornsby.
10	10	"The Hitchhiker"	Marita Grabiak	Sean Whitesell	December 21, 2003	176709	13.95
The team reopens the 1997 murder of Matthew Mills, a 20-year-old hitchhiker killed on his way back to Philadelphia after winning big in Atlantic City, when new evidence is uncovered linking a current case to his murder.: Song featured in the intro: "Walkin' on the Sun", by Smash Mouth; Song featured in the finale: "I Believe", by Blessid Union of Souls.
11	11	"Hubris"	Agnieszka Holland	Stacy Kravetz & Kim Newton	January 11, 2004	176710	15.20
The team reopens the 1995 murder of 21-year-old Holly Richardson at the request of one of her college professors, whose career ended in disgrace after he was suspected of her death after their affair was discovered. The professor hopes to clear his name after another young woman is killed identically to Holly, though the team is skeptical about his innocence.: Song featured in the intro: "Wonderful", by Adam Ant; Song featured in the finale: "Don't Look Back in Anger", by Oasis.
12	12	"Glued"	Peter Markle	Tyler Bensinger	January 18, 2004	176711	12.80
Lt. Stillman asks Lilly to reinvestigate one of his first cases as a homicide detective: the 1980 murder of 8-year-old Timothy Barnes, who was knocked out and left on the snowy ground and died tragically of hypothermia.: Song featured in the intro: "Running on Empty", by Jackson Browne; Song featured in the finale: "Follow You Follow Me", by Genesis.
13	13	"The Letter"	Tim Hunter	Veena Cabreros Sud	January 25, 2004	176713	15.75
After a young woman comes forward with new information about the death of her grandmother, Lilly and the squad reopen the unsolved 1939 rape and murder of a 25-year-old black woman, Sadie Douglas. During their investigation, the team uncovers racial tensions and a secret romance that could help identify the killer.: Song featured in the intro: "Dream Lucky Blues", by Julia Lee.; Song featured in the finale: "Blue Moon", by Ella Fitzgerald.
14	14	"Boy in the Box"	Karen Gaviola	Meredith Stiehm	February 15, 2004	176712	17.33
The team reopens the case of the 1958 murder of an unidentified 6-year-old boy, whose body was found in a cardboard box in a field outside Philadelphia, after a suitcase is found containing a photo of the boy, among other things.: Song featured in the intro: "You're the Nearest Thing to Heaven", by Johnny Cash; Song featured in the finale: "Sweeter Than You", by Ricky Nelson.
15	15	"Disco Inferno"	James Whitmore, Jr.	Tyler Bensinger	February 22, 2004	176715	15.34
The team reinvestigates a mysterious 1978 fire that killed 22 people and destroyed a disco nightclub when the newly discovered remains of 22-year-old Benny Rosen reveal that he was killed by a gunshot to the head, which leads the team to deduce that the fire was actually a cover-up.: Song featured in the intro: "Disco Inferno", by The Trammps; Song featured in the finale: "Last Dance", by Donna Summer.
16	16	"Volunteers"	Allison Anders	Jan Oxenberg	March 7, 2004	176716	15.98
Human remains found during a building demolition prompt the team to investigate the unsolved 1969 double murders of 22-year-old Julia Hoffman and 23-year-old Gerald Gary, two hippies who belonged to a group that facilitated access to illegal abortions.: Song featured in the intro: "Volunteers", by Jefferson Airplane; Song featured in the finale: "Get Together", by The Youngbloods.
17	17	"The Lost Soul of Herman Lester"	Tim Matheson	Sean Whitesell	March 14, 2004	176714	15.92
After a high school basketball phenom receives threatening phone calls, the team reopens the 1987 murder of his father, 17-year-old Herman Lester, another star basketball player who was found stabbed to death hours after leading his team to victory in the State Championship.: Song featured in the intro: "Walk This Way", by Run-DMC and Aerosmith.; Song featured in the finale: "Walk Like a Man", by Bruce Springsteen.
18	18	"Resolutions"	Alex Zakrzewski	Kim Newton	March 28, 2004	176717	14.26
The team reinvestigates the 2000 murder of 39-year-old Greg Cardiff, a husband and father who was killed in a hit-and-run accident just a few minutes into New Year's Day, after a recovering alcoholic comes forward as the possible culprit.: Song featured in the intro: "Save Tonight", by Eagle Eye Cherry.; Song featured in the finale: "Hands", by Jewel.
19	19	"Late Returns"	David Straiton	Jay Beattie & Dan Dworkin	April 4, 2004	176718	14.25
Suspicious evidence found at the scene of a current murder prompts the team to reopen the 1992 murder of 22-year-old Vanessa Prosser, a young and highly politically involved woman who was killed on the night of the 1992 presidential election.: Song featured in the intro: "Don't Stop", by Fleetwood Mac; Song featured in the finale: "Ordinary World", by Duran Duran.
20	20	"Greed"	Karen Gaviola	Stacy Kravetz	April 18, 2004	176719	12.93
The team reopens the 1985 murder of Charles Danville, a wealthy 35-year-old stockbroker who was shot and killed during an apparent carjacking gone wrong, after new evidence points towards premeditated murder.: Song featured in the intro: "Karma Chameleon", by Culture Club; Song featured in the finale: "All Through the Night", by Cyndi Lauper.
21	21	"Maternal Instincts"	Kevin Hooks	Laurie Arent	April 25, 2004	176720	14.83
When a juvenile delinquent comes forward claiming to have witnessed his mother's death, the team reinvestigates the 1989 murder of the young mother, 30-year-old Rebecca Morgan.: Song featured in the intro: "Closer to Fine", by Indigo Girls; Song featured in the finale: "Eternal Flame", by The Bangles.
22	22	"The Plan"	Agnieszka Holland	Veena Cabreros Sud	May 2, 2004	176721	14.39
The team reopens the 1999 murder of Nash Cavanaugh, a 35-year-old military academy's strict swim coach who drowned in the academy pool, after the homicide division receives a note suggesting his death was a homicide.: Song featured in the intro: "Machinehead", by Bush; Song featured in the finale: "Wise Up", by Aimee Mann.
23	23	"Lover's Lane"	Nelson McCormick	Meredith Stiehm	May 23, 2004	176722	14.53
When DNA evidence reveals a man was wrongfully convicted of murder, the team reopens the 1986 murder of Eve Kendell, a 15-year-old girl who was raped and killed during a date with her boyfriend, 16-year-old Mark Adams, who was also assaulted but survived, at a popular lovers' lane.: Song featured in the intro: "And We Danced", by The Hooters.; Song featured in the finale: "Leather and Lace", by Stevie Nicks and Don Henley.
