= Cold Case season 5 =

Cold Case
- Season 5
- No. of episodes: 18

Release
- Original network: CBS
- Original release: September 23, 2007 – May 4, 2008

Season chronology
- ← Previous; Season 4 Next → Season 6

The fifth season of Cold Case, an American television series, began airing on CBS on September 23, 2007, and concluded on May 4, 2008. Season five regular cast members include Kathryn Morris, Danny Pino, John Finn, Thom Barry, Jeremy Ratchford and Tracie Thoms. This season was originally scheduled to air 24 episodes, but due to the Writer's Strike only 18 episodes were produced and aired. The season also includes the series' 100th episode, "World's End".

== Cast ==
Actor	Character	Main cast	Recurring cast
Kathryn Morris	Det. Lilly Rush	entire season	—N/a
Danny Pino	Det. Scotty Valens	entire season	—N/a
John Finn	Lt. John Stillman	entire season	—N/a
Thom Barry	Det. Will Jeffries	entire season	—N/a
Jeremy Ratchford	Det. Nick Vera	entire season	—N/a
Tracie Thoms	Det. Kat Miller	entire season	—N/a
Bobby Cannavale	Det. Eddie Saccardo	—N/a	episodes 16, 18
Bonnie Root	ADA Alexandra Thomas	—N/a	episodes 5, 12
Doug Spinuzza	Louie Amante	—N/a	episodes 12, 18
Mark Rolston	Ari Gordon	—N/a	episodes 1, 5

== Episodes ==
No. overall	No. in season	Title	Directed by	Written by	Original release date	Prod. code	US viewers (millions)
94	1	"Thrill Kill"	Alex Zakrzewski	Veena Cabreros Sud	September 23, 2007	3T6351	12.75
The team reopens the 1994 triple murder of best friends Jack Raymes, George Russo, and Sean Costley after one of the two teenagers convicted of the crime commits suicide. Meanwhile, Lily struggles with being back at work following her shooting (Note: As depicted in S4E24 Stalker).: All songs in this episode are by Nirvana.; Song featured in the intro: "All Apologies", by Nirvana.; Song featured in the finale: "Come as You Are", by Nirvana.
95	2	"That Woman"	Roxann Dawson	Liz W. Garcia	September 30, 2007	3T6352	13.71
After a piece of clothing belonging to a murder victim is found in an old van, the team reopens the 1998 murder of Carrie Swett, a 15-year-old girl who had a reputation for being promiscuous. The investigation leads the team to a religious club where they learn a dark secret that could prove to be the key to solving the case.: Song featured in the intro: "I Will Buy You a New Life", by Everclear.; Song featured in the finale: "Black Balloon", by Goo Goo Dolls.
96	3	"Running Around"	Holly Dale	Jennifer M. Johnson	October 7, 2007	3T6353	13.02
When the younger sister of a missing person comes to the police for help, the team reopens the 2006 case of Anna Gunden, a 16-year-old Amish girl who was murdered while she was in Philadelphia experiencing the Amish rite of passage called "rumspringa".: Song featured in the intro: "Unwritten", by Natasha Bedingfield.; Song featured in the finale: "Breakaway", by Kelly Clarkson.
97	4	"Devil Music"	Chris Fisher	Kate Purdy	October 14, 2007	3T6354	13.88
The team reinvestigates the 1953 case of Bingo Zohar, a talented 19-year-old rock'n'roll singer, when new evidence comes forth suggesting he wasn't killed in the place where his body was found. The investigation reveals that Bingo was facing discouragement and bullying from his peers and family over his musical aspirations.: Song featured in the intro: "Dimples and Cherry Cheeks", by The Andrews Sisters.; Song featured in the finale: "Can't Help Falling in Love", by Elvis Presley.
98	5	"Thick As Thieves"	Holly Dale	Christopher Silber	October 21, 2007	3T6355	11.69
The team reopens the unsolved 1989 case of an unidentified Jane Doe, 30-year-old Margot Chambers, when she dies in the hospital after being comatose since the day she was shot 18 years ago, only to encounter a long list of suspects when they learn that the woman was a professional grifter who had swindled dozens of people, and now have to solve which of her victims was the most motivated to kill her.: Song featured in the intro: "All She Wants Is", by Duran Duran.; Song featured in the finale: "One More Try", by George Michael.
99	6	"Wunderkind"	Kevin Bray	Greg Plageman	October 28, 2007	3T6356	11.78
The team reopens the 2002 murder of Terrence "T" Carter, a 14-year-old social outcast from the wrong side of the tracks, after it's discovered his mother had been using his social security number since his death. The team discovers that he was a prodigy with numbers and his talent may have led him to dangerous territory.: Song featured in the intro: "Superstylin', by Groove Armada.; Song featured in the finale: "Natural Blues", by Moby.
100	7	"World's End"	Roxann Dawson	Gavin Harris	November 4, 2007	3T6357	13.89
When human remains are discovered in the bottom of a well, the team opens the 1938 case of a 33-year-old housewife, Audrey Metz, who went missing the night of Orson Welles's radio broadcast of The War of the Worlds.: Song featured in the intro: "Begin the Beguine", by Artie Shaw.; Song featured in the finale: "Always", by Frank Sinatra.
101	8	"It Takes a Village"	Kevin Bray	Erica Shelton	November 11, 2007	3T6358	12.78
When the body of a newly missing boy, 12-year-old Shemar Reynolds, is found in a cargo container, the remains of three other victims, 12-year-old Damont Henderson, 9-year-old Kendrick Malone, and 14-year-old Marcus Hollister, who vanished from 1999 to 2003 are found. The team realizes they're dealing with a serial killer and must figure out his M.O. before he strikes again.: Song featured in the intro: "Undeniable" by Mat Kearney.; Song featured in the finale: "You're Gonna Make It" by KJ-52 feat. Blanca Reyes.
102	9	"Boy Crazy"	Holly Dale	Joanna Lovinger	November 18, 2007	3T6359	14.12
The team reinvestigates the 1963 death of Samantha Randall, a 16-year-old tomboy whose death was ruled a suicide, after new evidence suggests that she may have been murdered for acting and dressing like a boy. The team discovers that her own father sent her to a hospital for "gender deviants.": Song featured in the intro: "He's A Rebel", by The Crystals.; Song featured in the finale: "Everybody Loves Me But You", by Brenda Lee.
103	10	"Justice"	Agnieszka Holland	Veena Cabreros Sud	November 25, 2007	3T6360	12.98
The team reopens the 1982 murder of Mike Delaney, a popular 22-year-old college valedictorian who was shot to death on the night of his graduation, after "RAPIST" is spraypainted onto his grave. The team discovers that the young man was a serial rapist, whose victims were rebuffed when they sought help.: Song featured in the intro: "Space Age Love Song", by A Flock of Seagulls.; Song featured in the finale: "Save a Prayer", by Duran Duran.
104	11	"Family 8108"	Jeannot Szwarc	Kellye Garrett & Elizabeth Randall	December 9, 2007	3T6361	11.57
The team reopens the 1945 murder of Ray Takahashi, a hardworking 45-year-old Japanese-American family man who was killed outside an Army-Navy football game. The team learns that the original investigation may have been incomplete after they discover that the victim and his family were among the thousands of Japanese-Americans who were sent to WWII internment camps.: Song featured in the intro: "Boogie Woogie Bugle Boy" by The Andrews Sisters.; Song featured in the finale: "Billy's Letter" by David Huynh.
105	12	"Sabotage"	Nicole Kassell	Greg Plageman	January 6, 2008	3T6362	10.96
The team searches for a serial bomber whose latest pipe bomb maimed the wrong target and whose three previous bombings, in 1999, 2001 and 2003, collectively blinded a man and killed two others.: Song featured in the intro: "Last Christmas", by Wham!.; Song featured in the finale: "Apologize" by OneRepublic.
106	13	"Spiders"	John Peters	Liz W. Garcia	February 17, 2008	3T6363	9.58
The team reopens the 1998 murder of a 17-year-old runaway girl, Tamyra Borden, after her father is arrested for beating his stepdaughter. The team discovers that the victim became entangled with a group of neo-Nazis who were suspected of another unsolved murder around the same time.: Song featured in the intro: "Someday", by Sugar Ray.; Song featured in the finale: "Tonight, Tonight", by The Smashing Pumpkins.
107	14	"Andy in C Minor"	Jeannot Szwarc	Gavin Harris	March 30, 2008	3T6364	9.80
After traces of blood linked back to a missing teen are found, the team re-investigates the 2006 case of Andy Rierdan, a 17-year-old boy who went missing from a high school for the deaf. The investigation soon reveals the victim's efforts to be able to hear again, much to dismay of his friends and family.: Song featured in the opening: "SOS", by Rihanna.; Song featured in the finale: "Look After You", by The Fray.
108	15	"The Road"	Holly Dale	Jennifer M. Johnson	April 6, 2008	3T6365	11.93
Lilly and Scotty travel to West Virginia to escort a suspected murderer who is believed to have abducted a woman, Brenda McDowell, from her 2007 engagement party and then killed her, back to Philadelphia. Now, as they drive back to Philadelphia, they must listen to his clues and his motives after they find out that he is a serial killer whose last victim is possibly still alive.: Song featured in the intro: "Umbrella, by Rihanna.; Song featured in the finale: "Come Home, by OneRepublic.
109	16	"Bad Reputation"	Alex Zakrzewski	Christopher Silber	April 13, 2008	3T6366	9.43
The 1997 case of Pete Doyle, an 45-year-old ex-con who went missing after having been released from prison, is reinvestigated when the victim's decomposed severed hand is discovered in a crack house during a drug bust. To solve the case, they must discover if the victim had gotten back to his old habits, or if he was killed trying to protect his estranged son.: Song featured in the intro: "Santa Monica", by Everclear.; Song featured in the finale: "Recovering the Satellites", by Counting Crows.
110	17	"Slipping"	Kevin Bray	Erica Shelton	April 27, 2008	3T6367	11.62
The team reinvestigates the 1962 death of Nancy Patterson, a 27-year-old housewife and budding writer whose death was ruled a suicide, after it is revealed that her suicide note does not match her handwriting. The team soon learns that the victim was acting paranoid shortly before her death, but a shocking discovery turns the case upside down.: Song featured in the intro: "Crazy", by Patsy Cline.; Song featured in the finale: "End of the World", by Brenda Lee.
111	18	"Ghost of My Child"	Roxann Dawson	Liz W. Garcia	May 4, 2008	3T6368	11.56
Priscilla Chapin, a former drug addict whose son, Max, was seemingly killed in an apartment fire in 2005, comes forth claiming she just saw her child in the park. The team must re-examine the original crime scene to see if the boy could have been abducted during the fire and if so, who really started the fire.: Song featured in the intro: "Better Days", by Goo Goo Dolls.; Song featured in the finale: "Far Away", by Nickelback.
