= Cold Case season 6 =

Cold Case
- Season 6
- No. of episodes: 23

Release
- Original network: CBS
- Original release: September 28, 2008 – May 10, 2009

Season chronology
- ← Previous; Season 5 Next → Season 7

The sixth season of Cold Case, an American television series, began airing on CBS on September 28, 2008, and concluded on May 10, 2009. Season Six regular cast members include Kathryn Morris, Danny Pino, John Finn, Thom Barry, Jeremy Ratchford and Tracie Thoms.

== Cast ==
Actor	Character	Main cast	Recurring cast
Kathryn Morris	Det. Lilly Rush	entire season	—N/a
Danny Pino	Det. Scotty Valens	entire season	—N/a
John Finn	Lt. John Stillman	entire season	—N/a
Thom Barry	Det. Will Jeffries	entire season	—N/a
Jeremy Ratchford	Det. Nick Vera	entire season	—N/a
Tracie Thoms	Det. Kat Miller	entire season	—N/a
Bobby Cannavale	Det. Eddie Saccardo	—N/a	episodes 1, 3
Tania Raymonde	Frankie Rafferty	—N/a	episodes 9-13, 15, 17, 22
Jonathan LaPaglia	ADA Curtis Bell	—N/a	episodes 10, 15, 17

== Episodes ==
No. overall	No. in season	Title	Directed by	Written by	Original release date	Prod. code	US viewers (millions)
112	1	"Glory Days"	Roxann Dawson	Gavin Harris	September 28, 2008	3T7151	11.36
The team reopens the 1973 murder of 21-year-old college football player Mike "Bad Moon" McShane when an old friend of Jeffries brings evidence that the crime may have occurred later than originally thought.: Song featured in the intro: "Takin' Care of Business", by Bachman–Turner Overdrive.; Song featured in the finale: "Reelin' In the Years", by Steely Dan.
113	2	"True Calling"	Paris Barclay	Christopher Silber	October 5, 2008	3T7152	11.10
The team reopens the 1991 murder of inner-city schoolteacher Laura McKinney, originally termed a carjacking gone wrong, after a former student she inspired to become a teacher finds her car keys in an old desk.: Song featured in the intro: "Right Here, Right Now", by Jesus Jones.; Song featured in the finale: "Half a World Away", by R.E.M.
114	3	"Wednesday's Women"	John Finn	Erica Shelton	October 12, 2008	3T7153	10.99
The team investigates the 1964 death of door-to-door Tupperware saleswoman Miriam Forrester, originally termed a hit-and-run accident, after her younger sister finds a suitcase that was sent from Mississippi the day her body was found.: Songs featured in the intro: "You Really Got Me", by The Kinks / "Blue Velvet", by Bobby Vinton.; Song featured in the finale: "This Little Light of Mine", by Tracie Thoms.
115	4	"Roller Girl"	Holly Dale	Elle Triedman	October 19, 2008	3T7154	11.29
The team reinvestigates the 1978 murder of Missy Gallavan, a 15-year-old roller skater who was found in a ravine, when a convicted thief reveals some information regarding her death to get a lighter sentence.: Song featured in the intro: "September", by Earth, Wind & Fire.; Song featured in the finale: "Sentimental Lady", by Bob Welch.
116	5	"Shore Leave"	Alex Zakrzewski	Elwood Reid	October 26, 2008	3T7155	11.97
When human remains and dog tags are found inside an old oil barrel, the team investigates the disappearance of Jimmy Tulley, a 17-year-old Marine who was reported AWOL on his last night of shore leave in 1951.: Song featured in the intro: "Sound Off", by Vaughan Monroe; Song featured in the finale: "Taps", by Daniel Butterfield (in the arrangement of new-age piano duo The O'Neill Brothers).
117	6	"The Dealer"	Chris Fisher	Greg Plageman	November 2, 2008	3T7156	11.66
The team examines the circumstances surrounding the 1981 disappearance of car dealership employee Donna D'Amico after her skeletal remains are found in the trunk of an abandoned car at the local salvage yard.: Song featured in the intro: "The Stroke", by Billy Squier.; Song featured in the finale: "Who's Crying Now", by Journey.
118	7	"One Small Step"	David Von Ancken	Taylor Elmore	November 9, 2008	3T7157	12.69
The team reopens the 1969 death of science enthusiast Danny Finch, whose body was found the day after the Apollo 11 landing, when the original investigating detective receives a homemade metal rocket bearing the victim's name.: Song featured in the intro: "Bad Moon Rising", by Creedence Clearwater Revival.; Song featured in the finale: "A Whiter Shade of Pale", by Procol Harum.
119	8	"Triple Threat"	Kevin Bray	Kathy Ebel	November 16, 2008	3T7158	12.28
The team reexamines the 1989 murder of Nadia Koslov, an 18-year-old Russian opera singer who emigrated from the former Soviet Union with her family, when her brother recovers her long-lost bag from a stranger on the street.: Song featured in the intro: "Habanera", from the opera Carmen, by Georges Bizet.; Song featured in the finale: "True Colors", by Cyndi Lauper.
120	9	"Pin Up Girl"	Chris Fisher	Gavin Harris	November 23, 2008	3T7159	12.15
The team reexamines the 1953 murder of pin-up model Rita Flynn after a book with photos of the crime scene is published and a fan brings in a unique photograph taken moments before her death.: Song featured in the intro: "Look at That Girl", by Guy Mitchell.; Song featured in the finale: "Can't I", by Nat King Cole.
121	10	"Street Money"	Carlos Avila	Christopher Silber	November 30, 2008	3T7160	11.52
When an inmate exchanges some procured information on an old shooting, the team reopens the 2005 murder of Dexter Collins, a 30-year-old African-American aspiring politician who vowed to rid the lower-class neighborhood he grew up in of drug dealers who preyed on young kids.: Song featured in the intro: "Gone", by Kanye West ft. Consequence & Cam'ron; Song featured in the finale: "Hands of Time", by Groove Armada.
122	11	"Wings"	David Von Ancken	Jennifer M. Johnson	December 21, 2008	3T7161	12.01
The 1960 disappearance of Ally Thurston, a 21-year-old flight attendant, is reopened after her remains are found in the rubble of a demolished Philadelphia hotel. The team learns she was trying to unionize her coworkers to battle the sexist work environment of the flight industry.: All songs in this episode are by Frank Sinatra.; Song featured in the intro: "Come Fly with Me", by Frank Sinatra.; Song featured in the finale: "Someone to Watch Over Me", by Frank Sinatra.
123	12	"Lotto Fever"	Agnieszka Holland	John Brian King	January 4, 2009	3T7162	12.67
The detectives reinvestigate the 2007 murder of Ed Dubinski, a 34-year-old auto mechanic whose lottery winnings earned him several fair-weather friends, when it is found that his bank account had recently been accessed.: Song featured in the intro: "The Underdog", by Spoon.; Song featured in the finale: "On the Way Back Home", by Lucero.
124	13	"Breaking News"	Holly Dale	Erica Shelton	January 11, 2009	3T7163	12.30
The team reopens the 1988 murder of Jane Everett, a 27-year-old Philadelphia news anchor. They soon learn that she was working on a big story involving a local factory's deadly working conditions shortly before her death.: Song featured in the intro: "Simply Irresistible", by Robert Palmer.; Song featured in the finale: "Shout", by Tears for Fears.
125	14	"The Brush Man"	Roxann Dawson	Elwood Reid	January 25, 2009	3T7164	13.26
When remains are found at the bottom of a drained duck pond, the team reopens the 1967 murder of Roy Dunn, an enigmatic 35-year-old door-to-door salesman who was popular with the neighborhood residents. The team soon uncovers some troubling secrets in the neighborhood where he was last seen and wonders if he saw something that may have gotten him killed.: Song featured in the intro: "I'll Be Your Mirror", by the Velvet Underground.; Song featured in the finale: "Pale Blue Eyes", by the Velvet Underground.
126	15	"Witness Protection"	Alex Zakrzewski	Elle Triedman	February 15, 2009	3T7165	10.89
The team opens the 2008 case of Ben Feldman, a man who was murdered while in the witness protection program, when his widow comes to the police asking for help in looking for their missing son, who might be looking for the killer/killers who murdered his father for revenge.: Song featured in the finale: "Until the Day Is Done", by R.E.M.
127	16	"Jackals"	Marcos Siega	Taylor Elmore	March 8, 2009	3T7166	12.62
The team reinvestigates the 1976 murder of honor student Sarah Blake at the request of her father Colin, an ex-convict who recently found a photograph of her with a member of a local motorcycle gang.: Song featured in the intro: "Magic Man", by Heart.; Song featured in the finale: "Simple Man", by Lynyrd Skynyrd.
128	17	"Officer Down"	Alex Zakrzewski	Christopher Silber	March 15, 2009	3T7167	13.03
When a robbery at a local convenience store leaves longtime owner Henry "Pop" Walters dead and Jeffries fighting for his life, the team juggles tracking the shooter down and curtailing their emotions.: Song featured in the intro: "I Wish It Would Rain", by The Temptations; Song featured in the finale: "The Judgment", by Solomon Burke
129	18	"Mind Games"	Donald Thorin, Jr.	Gavin Harris	March 22, 2009	3T7168	11.41
The team reopens the 2004 case of Julie Ramirez, a psychiatrist who died in a suspicious fire, after the former roommate of one of her patients finds a notebook detailing the fire. The case proves rather hard to solve as the patient has had severe schizophrenia for years.: All songs in this episode are by John Lennon.; Song featured in the intro: "Beautiful Boy (Darling Boy)", by John Lennon; Song featured in the finale: "Watching the Wheels", by John Lennon
130	19	"Libertyville"	Marcos Siega	Kathy Ebel	March 29, 2009	3T7169	11.86
The team reinvestigates the 1958 murder of Julian Bellowes, a newlywed real estate developer who was spearheading a new suburban concept, when new evidence suggests his body might have been moved after he was killed. The case is turned upside down, however, when they learn a dark secret the victim had been keeping for a long time.: Song featured in the intro: "Are You Havin' Any Fun?", by Tony Bennett; Song featured in the finale: "This Land Is Your Land", by Sharon Jones & the Dap-Kings
131	20	"Stealing Home"	Kevin Bray	Danny Pino & Elwood Reid	April 12, 2009	3T7170	10.56
The team investigates the 1999 murder of Gonzalo Luque, a 23-year-old Cuban immigrant who arrived in Philadelphia on a small boat with others and was pursuing a major league baseball career, after an illegal immigrant hoping to stay in the country says he found the victim's body in another location.: Song featured in the intro: "537 C.U.B.A.", by Orishas; Song featured in the finale: "Vida Mas Simple" by Nil Lara.
132	21	"November 22nd"	Jeannot Szwarc	Ryan Farley	April 26, 2009	3T7171	10.57
The team reexamines the 1963 murder of hustler Patrick Lennox, who died the same day President John F. Kennedy was assassinated, after workers find the murder weapon during remodeling of the pool hall he used to frequent.: Song featured in the intro: "Green Onions", by Booker T. & the M.G.'s.; Song featured in the finale: "My One and Only Love" by John Coltrane.
133	22	"The Long Blue Line"	Roxann Dawson	Jennifer M. Johnson & Greg Plageman	May 3, 2009	3T7172	12.46
The team reinvestigates the 2005 death of military cadet Kate Butler after her body is found in an unmarked grave at a military cemetery.: All the music featured in this episode was performed by Pearl Jam.; Song featured in the intro: "Corduroy", by Pearl Jam.; Song featured in the finale: "Yellow Ledbetter" by Pearl Jam.
134	23	"Into The Blue"	Jeannot Szwarc	Jennifer M. Johnson & Greg Plageman	May 10, 2009	3T7173	11.84
As the investigation into Butler's murder continues, Lilly leaves the hospital before her tests are complete and the killer tries to stop the investigation to remain hidden.: All the music featured in this episode is performed by Pearl Jam.; Song featured in the intro: "Once", by Pearl Jam.; Song featured in the finale: "Black" by Pearl Jam.
