= A Time to Hate =

A Time to Hate may refer to:

- A Time to Hate (novel), a 2004 Star Trek: The Next Generation novel by Robert Greenberger
- "A Time to Hate" (Cold Case), a 2003 television episode
