= List of Cold Case characters =

This is a list of characters in the CBS television drama Cold Case.

== Main characters ==
=== Lilly Rush ===
Lilly Rush
- Cold Case character
- First appearance: Pilot
- Last appearance: "Shattered"
- Created by: Meredith Stiehm
- Portrayed by: Kathryn Morris; Christina Cellner (young); Makenna Barrett (age 6); Harley Graham (age 9); Megan Helin (age 10)

In-universe information
- Alias: "Lilly" "Lil"
- Gender: Female
- Title: Detective Rush
- Occupation: Homicide Detective
- Family: Paul Cooper (father); Ellen Rush (mother; deceased); Christina Rush (sister); Finn Cooper (half-brother); Celeste Cooper (step-mother)

Lillian "Lilly" Rush was known as the only female homicide detective in Philadelphia, until the later arrival of Lennie Desalle, then Josie Sutton, and finally Kat Miller. She specialized in working cold cases alongside her partner, Scotty Valens. According to Lilly, "People shouldn't be forgotten, even if they're my kind of people. Maybe, they don't have a lot of money, they don't have lawyers, but they matter".

Lilly was raised on welfare by an alcoholic mother, Ellen Rush, who often neglected her. Her father, Paul Cooper, left the family when Lilly was six. Lilly was left to fend for herself and care for her younger sister, Christina Rush. The family lived in Kensington, a rough part of Philadelphia.

At the age of ten, Lilly had been sent out late at night by her mother to buy alcohol, and a man brutally attacked and robbed her. Suffering a broken jaw, among other injuries, young Lilly was nursed by Ray Williams. The detective that apprehended the man that attacked Lilly was Lt. John Stillman. Lt Stillman became a mentor and father figure after capturing her attacker when she was a child. After joining the police force, Stillman followed her career and chose her for Homicide when she passed her detective exam ("The Long Blue Line"/"Into the Blue").

As a child Lilly would have nightmares so her mother would read to her The Velveteen Rabbit.

Lilly has a contentious relationship with her sister. At the end of season seven, after rescuing her sister ("Shattered") Lilly discovers that she is now an aunt to Christina's baby daughter.

Her first homicide investigation was in 1999. The victim was Vaughn Bubley.

Shortly after Lilly's change from on-the-line jobs to cold cases, her partner, Chris Lassing, transfers out because of his diabetic condition, leading to Scotty being promoted to Homicide and becoming Lilly's partner. She thinks rationally but at the same time she also has the necessary compassion to deal appropriately with victims and their families. While cold and unyielding with criminals and suspects, she can be devoted to a fault in her concern for the suffered close ones of the victims.In season one, Lilly started a relationship with ADA Jason Kite. They looked happy together but in the last episode ("Lovers Lane'') she is visited at her home at three o'clock in the morning by the distressed partner of a victim. While her boyfriend Jason is waiting for her in the apartment, she takes time to comfort the man. As a result, Kite breaks up with her, pointing out her too strong devotion to help other people as a reason.

Lilly solves the most difficult cases in order to seek the truth after all these years in hopes of giving the victim's family and the victims themselves, justice. She often works long hours on these cases. Because of this, her relationships with men are relatively shaky and her family can best be described as dysfunctional.

One of Lilly's most challenging cases was that of a serial killer who stalked his victims like wild animals. One of the victim's bodies from 1985, Janet Lambert, is found by hikers in a wildlife preserve. The investigation quickly leads Lilly and the cold case squad to the grisly discovery of 8 more decapitated bodies. Soon, suspicion falls on George Marks, who gets brought into the interview room. During interrogation, he manages to get most of the team members agitated until Lilly is finally brought in to get George to confess to these gruesome murders. Instead, George hints about Lilly's dark secret as being the real reason why she became a cop. By this, he was referring to her being attacked as a child, which she rarely discussed. Months later, when Lilly finally confronted George with evidence that he murdered not only the victims from their previous encounter, but his own mother as well, George forced Lilly into reliving her attack before their shootout, which ended his life.

In 2007, shortly after the death of her mother Ellen Rush, Lilly interviewed a victim, Kim Jacobi, only to be ambushed by the person who had murdered Kim's family the year before. The entire Homicide department was held hostage for a short time, with Detectives Scotty Valens and Kat Miller outside the building and under orders from the SWAT team not to break their perimeter. Scotty broke this order and approached Lilly's location in an observation room, where she was attempting to negotiate with the killer. Using a code word they had established that morning, Scotty shot the killer from the blind side of a two-way mirror in the interview room, but not before he shot Lilly in the chest. While undergoing surgery, Lilly apparently sees her late mother before her. She eventually recovers in time to convince John Stillman to reopen the Jack Raymes case, and credits Scotty for saving her life.

In May 2009, while working on the Kate Butler Case, Lilly is involved in a car accident in which her vehicle was pushed off a bridge and into the river forty feet below. However, later on, Lilly begins stalking Moe Kitchner, who is responsible for the accident. He is eventually killed by the victim's father.

Months later, the FBI is trying to recruit her.

=== Scotty Valens ===
Scotty Valens
- Cold Case character
- First appearance: "Love Conquers Al" (1.06)
- Last appearance: "Shattered" (7.22)
- Created by: Meredith Stiehm
- Portrayed by: Danny Pino; Allen Alvarado (young)

In-universe information
- Alias: "Scott", "Alvaro"
- Gender: Male
- Occupation: Homicide Detective
- Family: Ramiro Valens (father); Rosa Valens (mother); Mike Valens (brother); Alegria Valens (sister-in-law); Emilio Valens (nephew)
- Significant other: Christina Rush ADA Alexandra Thomas Frankie Rafferty Elisa

Detective Scotty Valens is a Philadelphia homicide detective and Lilly Rush's partner. He transferred to Homicide from West Detectives in the fall of 2003, replacing Lilly's first partner Chris Lassing. Young, cocky, and full of himself at first, he likes to brag about his various romances but he nonetheless quickly earned the rest of the squad's respect. He appeared on a crossover episode of CSI: NY called "Cold Reveal".

Son of a Cuban father, Ramiro, and a Puerto Rican mother, Rosa. Episode 1.16, "Volunteers", states he was born some time in the 1970s, likely making him the youngest detective in the squad (with the possible exception of Kat Miller). It was further revealed in the 2005 episode "The Promise" that he was 28 when he transferred to Homicide, giving him a birth date sometime in 1975. Scotty is mentioned as having a number of siblings though only one, his older brother Mike, has appeared on the show.

Scotty's Granddad had ALS. He used to be a boxer, but at the end he couldn't even hold up a spoon. He suffered for weeks before he died. Scotty went to soccer camp as a kid. As a kid his late girlfriend Elisa lived 6 blocks away from Scotty. He has been shown to have a short temper at times, but is a very loyal partner to Lilly. Like she, he also has difficulty with personal relationships. It's striking that Scotty was often interested in Lilly's relationships.

In 1998, season 3, episode 15, he worked as undercover under the alias of Alvaro in a drug investigation and he met a Colombian woman named Ana Castilla, a drug mule. Scotty started to develop feelings for her but she rejected him because he told her that he had a girlfriend (Elisa) who wanted to marry him but he didn't. Ana probably saved Scotty and Elisa's relationship by advising him he take it seriously. Ana only wanted to return to her country, Colombia. She realized Scotty was not who he said. Valens tried to protect Ana giving a phone number in case she need help. Ana was murdered shortly after. In 2006, Scotty captured Ana's murderers and their boss Ramiro.

In the first season, Scotty kept his and Elisa's relationship hidden from his colleagues until she introduced herself to Lilly. Later, he revealed to Lieutenant Stillman that he and Elisa were once engaged before she got sick with schizophrenia. However, when she was discharged and her health improved for several months, Scotty showed no real interest in marrying her. He had known her for many years and felt affection and conmpassion for her. They had a dispassionate relationship that looked more like a friendship but Valens was probably by her side because her suffering moved him and wanted to help her. At the end of the first season, Scotty decided walk out on her and in the second season Elisa is hospitalized again due to her illness. She commits suicide in the Season Two episode “Blank Generation.” In the beginning, he receive the news of Elisa's death calmly. She left a suicide note in which she talks about the good times they had together. Her death is ruled as a suicide but Valens does not believe this. He insisted on keeping a cold case file open on her. Scotty was unfaithful to her and, finally, he broke up with her that's why he was guilt-ridden for the suicide of the unlucky girl for a long time.

Shortly after, Valens had an intimate relationship with Lilly's sister Christina which severely strained his friendship with Lilly for its duration. Scotty and Christina lived together for some time until she was accused of fraud and fled without saying goodbye to him. In season seven, she was abducted by her daughter's father in the series finale. Scotty is shown assisting Lilly and the squad in rescuing her.

In season three, Detective Josie Sutton was assigned to Homicide and Scotty quickly expressed interest in her but she rejected him. Later she was transferred.

Scotty also had a passionate relationship with ADA Alexandra Thomas. She is introduced in season four due to a child abuse case that involved Scotty's brother Mike as a past victim. In the last episode, Scotty is devastated after Lilly is seriously wounded by a gunshot and Alex comforts him. In season five, when Valens was investigated by Internal Affairs, Alex revealed compromising information about him, putting his job at risk. Despite that Scotty and Thomas start a relationship which they kept secret at first, although later a few months, he wanted to bring it to light but she refused it. Their relationship took a turn for the worse when her office disclosed that a serial bomber's intendend target had survived, which nearly killed the man's wife and adaughter. Scotty blamed Alex for this and so their relationship broke up.

After, he briefly dated with Frankie Rafferty, a lab technician, but the affair ends due to her marriage. Frankie decided to reunite with her husband but months later, she decides to end her marriage and attempts to reconnect with Scotty but he rejected her.

Scotty's rogue attitude has worked against him more than once. In the episode "Offender", he revealed the identity of a suspect to a vigilante father which allowed the father to find and nearly kill said suspect. In the season four finale, during a hostage situation in the police squad room, he disobeys a S.W.A.T. commanders' orders and enters the building. He ends up shooting the gunman, drawing the interest of Internal Affairs, who question whether or not the shooting followed protocol (as well as bringing up the Burrell case). They ordered Scotty to take a month's unpaid leave as punishment, but Lt. John Stillman overruled them, taking the leave for himself in order to ensure Scotty stayed on the force.

In season seven, Scotty learns his beloved mother was assaulted, but she refuses to say more or even press charges. Investigating on his own, Scotty realized his mother was actually raped and goes on a personal quest to find the perpetrator. Valens catches him and he sends him to prison but when he learned the rapist would be free in no time, Scotty made sure that he couldn't harm anyone else.

=== John Stillman ===
John Stillman
- Cold Case character
- First appearance: "Look Again"
- Last appearance: "Shattered"
- Created by: Meredith Stiehm
- Portrayed by: John Finn

In-universe information
- Alias: "Boss" "Lieutenant"
- Gender: Male
- Occupation: Senior Homicide Detective; Lieutenant
- Family: Andrew Stillman (brother)
- Spouse: Rita Hart (ex-wife)
- Children: Janie Stillman (daughter); Carl (son-in-law); Sean (maternal grandson)

Lieutenant John Stillman is the Chief of the Homicide Division in Philadelphia also the Commander of the Cold Case Squad.

A Vietnam combat veteran with some war-era stress as seen in the episode "Honor" he has shown himself to be stern but caring boss. His daughter was once assaulted, but survived and gave him a grandson. Due to his commitment to the job, his marriage was very strained and finally ended in divorce. He is an Irish-American (as is John Finn, the actor who portrays him). His older brother is a Catholic priest.

When he was young detective, Stillman worked the case of the assault of a ten-year-old Lilly Rush. He found the man who attacked. Lt Stillman became a mentor and father figure after capturing her attacker when she was a child. After joining the police force, Stillman followed her career and chose her for Homicide when she passed her detective exam. ("The Long Blue Line" / "Into the Blue")

The squad commander and occasionally a mentor and confidant to Lilly. In the fifth season (beginning in September 2007), he took the month's unpaid leave meant for Scotty Valens, in order to keep him on the force. Stillman, having reflected on his place in the police force during his suspension, later decided to retire, though later was inspired to return to duty when Lilly convinced him to help in a case ("Family 8108").

=== Will Jeffries ===
Will Jeffries
- Cold Case character
- First appearance: "Look Again"
- Last appearance: "Shattered"
- Created by: Meredith Stiehm
- Portrayed by: Thom Barry

In-universe information
- Gender: Male
- Occupation: Senior Homicide Detective
- Spouse: Mary Jeffries (wife, deceased)

Will Jeffries is a veteran police officer and the most senior detective in the Philadelphia Police Department's Homicide unit.

His childhood home life was suggested to be an abusive one, however, he was a talented football player until he injured his knee senior year, putting an end to any hope of playing professionally. At sixteen, he was caught stealing by store owner Henry "Pops" Walters, who put him to work in his store as penance. Pops would help Jeffries put his life on a better track.

On November 22, 1963, Jeffries was playing touch football at recess when he found out President John F. Kennedy had been assassinated.

Will is a country music fan, even working as a radio DJ in college. Will was married to Mary Jeffries for several years. He would later recall they had some difficulty after he returned from Vietnam.

Mary was killed in a hit and run in 1995 while changing a tire on the road. Ever since this, he has become very involved in Road Safety. He was told who the prime suspect was in his wife's death. On that night – exactly nine years after losing his wife, he went to find the man, Isaac Keller. He dragged the man outside an empty bar and held his gun to the man's head. He forced the man to tell him exactly why he did it and said that he had no right to live. He then realised that this wasn't the right way out and left the scene.

He has been investigating cold cases for many years, and especially enjoys tending to those cases where the black community has become the victims. One case especially stands out for him. When he was just a young boy, he stumbled across the body of Zeke Williams. But as time back then had it, he could not tell anyone as this would automatically make him the prime suspect, and being a black man, he had tough racial discrimination against him. The case went unsolved for 42 years, until one day, Will decided to open the case again, and soon it was solved for good.

Will is second in charge of the squad and takes this responsibility very seriously. He has had a number of opportunities to show his true colours. This has caused a few problems however. In one particular case, with Will in charge, the team disagreed with each other quite a lot. He was forced to get to know each team member. He knew who was better at what kind of job and who got along with whom. This not only helps him, but, in the long run, it helps the whole team.

He is very close to Lt. John Stillman. They have worked together for a long time. He has also befriended Det. Nick Vera. The two are partners for most of the time. Overall, Will is a shy person. He still has not removed his wedding ring. Det. Vera and Valens have often urged him to get out into the dating world again, but he refuses every time. He was happy with his wife, and he does not want to lose her loving memory. However, over the last few cases, he has had a few women after him. He is quite confused over this, but is willing to see where this will go. He feels very uncomfortable when Nick questions him about this, and denies that it is a date – almost as though it is the wrong thing to do.

Detective Will Jeffries takes the law very seriously. He will do everything in his power to put the culprit behind bars. When working on one particular case, Will became so angry with ADA William Danner, who had wrongfully prosecuted Andre Tibbs, consigning him to death row, that he punched him in the face.

=== Nick Vera ===
Nick Vera
- Cold Case character
- First appearance: "Look Again"
- Last appearance: "Shattered"
- Created by: Meredith Stiehm
- Portrayed by: Jeremy Ratchford

In-universe information
- Gender: Male
- Occupation: Homicide Detective
- Family: Julie Vera (ex-wife)

Detective Nick Vera is a Philadelphia homicide detective and part of the cold case squad. Nick Vera was born in the late 1960s. In 1989, Vera joined the police department and was first posted to the 9th District. By 1998, Vera had made detective.

In Episode 2.18 ("Ravaged"), Vera mentions that he and his wife Julie had tried to conceive for several years with no success. He indicates that during a prior relationship with Meagan Easton (sister of victim Sloane Easton), she had gotten pregnant and had an abortion.

=== Chris Lassing ===
Chris Lassing
- Cold Case character
- First appearance: "Look Again"
- Last appearance: "Churchgoing People"
- Created by: Meredith Stiehm
- Portrayed by: Justin Chambers

In-universe information
- Gender: Male
- Occupation: Homicide Detective

Chris Lassing was Lilly Rush's partner until the fall of 2003. Nicknamed 'Lass' by Lilly, he was a competent, hard-working detective but never quite shared Lilly's passion for cold cases. A smoker, he was also married and therefore wasn't fond of the long hours Lilly insisted on putting in. He later transferred out due to problems with diabetes. He was replaced by Scotty Valens, several weeks later.

Lassing appeared only in the first, second, and fourth episodes.

=== Kat Miller ===
Kat Miller
- Cold Case character
- First appearance: "Honor"
- Last appearance: "Shattered"
- Created by: Meredith Stiehm
- Portrayed by: Tracie Thoms

In-universe information
- Gender: Female
- Occupation: Homicide Detective

Kat Miller is the fourth female homicide detective in Philadelphia, after Lilly Rush and brief stints by Lennie Desalle and Josie Sutton. She joined the squad in the fall of 2005. She has a daughter named Veronica, and is estranged from her daughter's father.

== Recurring characters ==
=== Detectives and other police officers ===
- Detective Anna Mayes (Robin Weigert) (Seasons 1, 2, 3) is an old friend and colleague of Scotty's from West Detectives, Anna has assisted the squad on a few cases. She delivered the bad news in S2.311, when the body of Elisa, Scotty's ex-fiancée, was found in the Schuylkill River.
- Detective Gil Sherman (Kevin McCorkle) (Seasons 1, 2, 3) is the Head of the Fugitive Squad. Formerly worked Homicide with Lt. Stillman. After hiding years of alcoholism through the late 1980s to mid 1990s, he left Homicide to enter rehab. Sherman shows up when a fugitive case intersects with a cold case investigation or to provide information on a case he previously worked on.
- Detective Lennie Desalle (Sonya Leslie) (Season 2) was the second female homicide detective in Philadelphia, after Lilly Rush. She joined the squad in the spring of 2005. She was called to the scene when the skulls of nine women were found buried in the back yard of a house formerly owned by Simone Marks (S2.E23: "The Woods"). Lennie was part of the investigation into the murder of Simone, who was killed in the house in 1972, as well as the manhunt for George, who was still at large. After George was killed in a stand-off with Lilly, Lennie took down the pictures and information that the detectives had posted on George's victims. In the episode "Torn", Lilly said there were two female Homicide detectives (herself and Miller), suggesting Lennie was no longer in Homicide at that point.
- Detective Josie Sutton (Sarah Brown) (Season 3) is a second generation cop, her father having been killed in a line of duty when she was a child. She joined the squad at the start of the third season, following rumors of an affair with her sergeant at another precinct (rumors which proved to be false). This incident left her with something of a reputation which led to a less than warm welcome when she arrived, particularly from Vera. She tended to be hard on witnesses and suspects more often than the other detectives. Her time with the squad was no more than a few months, after which she took a personal leave and then apparently transferred out. This may have been caused by Scotty's advances, and her discomfort after the scandal with her former sergeant.
- Detective Eddie Saccardo (Bobby Cannavale) (Seasons 5-6, 7) is an uncouth but effective cop working Undercover, Saccardo first assisted the squad in investigating the murder of a reformed ex-convict. The rest of the squad grew to like Eddie, with the exception of Lilly, who seemed put off at every turn. Tensions eased slightly between the two of them weeks later, however, when they worked together to find a young woman's lost son. They later began dating for a few episodes, until he had to leave for a long term assignment. He met up with Lilly the following year while still undercover and the two rekindled their relationship. His undercover work meant any type of long-term relationship was impossible, however, and Lilly would be drawn towards FBI agent Ryan Cavanaugh months later. However, not much came from her attraction towards Ryan, but neither he nor Eddie are mentioned again near the series finale.
- Deputy Commissioner Pat Doherty (Keith Szarabajka) (Seasons 6-7) is A high-ranking, political-minded police officer in the pocket of corrupt city councilman Grover Boone. Doherty freely admitted to never liking Stillman, but it was not until Stillman questioned Boone about the murder of a man who had run against him, that Stillman truly earned Doherty's enmity. Doherty retaliated by having his former driver (now an officer in Internal Affairs) follow Jeffries to investigate evidence of Jeffries accepting bribes. Stillman learned of this investigation after Jeffries was shot, but later presented evidence to Doherty that cleared his name. He also warned Doherty, that he would "beat the ever-loving crap" out of Doherty, should he ever make trouble for someone under Stillman's command again. Months later Homicide was placed under Doherty's authority, bringing it, and Stillman, even further under his scrutiny. In "Jurisprudence", Doherty ordered Stillman to back off an off-the-books investigation into the death of a teenager held in dormitory for fear of department fallout. Because Stillman refused to back down, Doherty pulled rank and forced a transfer on Detective Kat Miller removing Miller from Stillman's unit. But Stillman managed to pull some strings with of the Department brass and get Miller reinstated to Homicide a few weeks later. It is later revealed that Doherty's dislike of Stillman was based on Stillman having arrested Doherty's son Matt on a drug charge years earlier. After Matt reformed, got married and became a father, Doherty acknowledged that the arrest had changed his son for the better, and eased up on Stillman. Sadly, months later, Matt was found to be an accessory to the death of a young woman in the Badlands in 1993 ("Shattered"), and that Doherty, fearing his son may have been involved, had suppressed evidence. Matt later confessed while Doherty was forced to answer for his actions to his superiors. What punishment he faced is unclear.
- Detective Pierson (James Hanlon) (Season 7) is a detective investigating the assault of several women in the seventh season. When evidence suggested Scotty's mother (see below) was one of the victims, Pierson quietly provided Scotty with information on the case.

=== Civilian Police Employees ===
- Dr. Frannie Ching (Susan Chuang) (Seasons 1-4) is a medical examiner who helped the squad in some cases. She joins to the crime lab replacing Dr. Barnsley. Although the victims have died several years ago, she is able to examine the dead bodies and find new evidence. In the episode "Baby Blues", she asked for the detectives to reopen the case of Iris Felice.
- Louie Amante (Doug Spinuzza) (Seasons 1, 4-5, 7) is a CSI who usually works with the squad on cases involving fire or explosives. Several of the squad attended Louie's wedding in 2010, where they investigated the mysterious death of the bride's former fiancée two years earlier. Suspicion passed between the bride, members of her family, and even Louie himself, before the death was found to be a suicide.
- Frankie Rafferty (Tania Raymonde) (Season 6) is a lab technician who works in the identification unit and begins flirting with Scotty when he stops by one day regarding a case. The two quickly start dating, however Frankie never tells Scotty she is married. Her husband Billy, from whom she is separated, finds out about Scotty and leaves harassing phone calls and even vandalizes his car, not knowing Scotty is a cop. Though Scotty is understandably upset with Frankie for not telling him about Billy, their affair continued until Frankie decides to try and work things out with her husband, instead. Frankie and Billy eventually divorce and she attempts to reconnect with Scotty but he rejects her and suggests that things between them be over for good.

=== ADAs ===
- ADA Jason Kite (Josh Hopkins) (Seasons 1-2, 3) is a persistent Assistant DA who was involved in a short-lived relationship with Lilly in the first season, which ended after he realized he would always come second to her job. He only appeared in one more episode after breaking it off with her. After a few drinks in the third season, Lilly left a message on Kite's voice-mail taking responsibility for the failure of their relationship.
- ADA Alexandra Thomas (Bonnie Root) (Seasons 4-5) is an assistant DA who worked with the squad. She first came to their attention when she prosecuted a pedophile whose victims had included Scotty's brother. She and Scotty have clashed several times, largely due to Thomas being concerned with "the big picture" whereas Scotty is more concerned with individual victims. There had been hints of sexual tension between the two for some time, however, finally, they start dating during the fifth season. Scotty wanted a serious relationship but she didn't it. Their relationship took a turn for the worse when her office disclosed that a serial bomber's intended target had survived, which led to another bomb which nearly killed the man's wife and daughter. Scotty blamed Thomas for this and she has not been seen on the show since.
- ADA Curtis Bell (Jonathan LaPaglia) (Seasons 6-7) is an assistant DA who first assisted the squad with the murder of a promising politician. Bell often appears disorganized and forgetful, leading both detectives and suspects to underestimate him, until he surprises them with effective and timely information. In episode 6.15 "Witness Protection", he gives Miller very important information that helps to solve the case. In episode 6.17 "Officer Down", we learn his dad was a cop who was killed in the line of duty and in episode 6.18 "Mind Games", we learn he has a daughter and a difficult relationship with his ex-wife. In the sixth-season finale, he asks Miller out and she accepts. The two begin a quiet relationship over the next several months. Bell is a single father of a young daughter and has had some custody issues with his ex (whom he refers to as "the soul-crusher"). Bell tends to socialize with the squad far more than Kite or Thomas did. His relationship with Miller deteriorates for a time due to their differing views on Miller's own custody battle with her ex, but they eventually reconcile.

=== Relatives and significant others ===
- Elisa (Marisol Nichols) (Season 1) was Scotty's childhood friend and onetime fiancée. At the end of the first season, he walked out on her. Elisa had some emotional problems and died in an apparent suicide at some point before the start of S2.E11, Blank Generation. Valens felt guilty and refused at first to believe it was a suicide, jumping on any alternate explanation, however unlikely, but Elisa's suicide appears to have been just that.
- Christina Rush (Nicki Aycox) (Seasons 2, 7) is Lilly's rebellious and irresponsible younger sister, who has long had a difficult relationship with Lilly. Christina becomes involved with Lilly's partner Scotty Valens against Lilly's wishes. Lilly still shows concern for her sister but is often frustrated by Christina's irresponsible behavior. It is revealed that the Christina ruined her relationship with Lilly when she slept with her fiancé, Patrick. Something she tells Scotty very vaguely but still upsets Lilly to even hear him brought up. After Scotty learned she was linked to a credit card scam, Christina abruptly left without saying goodbye to him or Lilly and did not return until Season 7. She wanted Lily to co-sign a home rental agreement, but Lilly refused because she did not trust her sister. Christina was revealed to be involved with a prescription drug fraud ring, and the leader of the ring was the father of her baby daughter. He later abducted her on suspicion she was informing Lilly about the group (she wasn't) but Lilly rescued her and her daughter and took down the ring's leader and his sidekick.
- Ray Williams (Brennan Elliott) (Seasons 3-4) is a biker who had been involved with Lilly in the past, even having asked her to marry him at one point. He re-entered her life twice on the show, once while she was dating Joseph, which led to some friction between the two. When last seen, he told her he was leaving for California.
- Ellen Rush (Meredith Baxter) (Seasons 3-4) is Lilly and Christina's alcoholic mother, who raised her children on welfare and often neglected them due to her drinking and promiscuity. She was first seen apparently sober in Season Three when she asked Lilly to be her Maid of Honor as she was getting married - for the fourth time. One year later, her husband had left her and Lilly was left to bail her out of jail after a particularly bad bender and then take care of her after she was diagnosed with cirrhosis of the liver due to years of alcohol abuse. Despite all this, Lilly and her mom bonded during what little time they had together before Ellen's sudden death in the Season Four finale.
- Joseph Shaw (Kenny Johnson) (Seasons 3-4) is a counselor who worked with troubled youths, an attempt was made on his life just before he was about to testify after he witnessed a murder. After he was presumed dead, Joseph went into hiding until Lilly discovered him alive a year later. The two began a relationship, though it was hindered by Lilly's trust issues (as well as the return of her ex, Ray Williams, into her life). Joseph eventually realized Lilly couldn't love him the way he loved her and ended their relationship.
- Mike Valens (Nestor Carbonell) (Season 4) is Scotty's older brother, he was sexually assaulted by a coach as a child. He initially denied the incident had occurred but eventually, after a bout of depression, agreed to testify against the coach when Scotty convinced him to do so. Young Mike was played by Lorenzo James Henrie.
- Toni Halstead (Sonja Sohn) (Season 4-5) is an African-American nurse and single mother of teenage Andre, both of whom are neighbors to Vera. Their paths first crossed in a dispute over the noise from Andre's playing basketball outside Vera's apartment. After making peace, Vera began dating Toni and started to become a father figure to Andre. Toni broke things off after Vera's long working hours left little time for Andre, but a chance encounter led to the two of them rekindling their relationship. A later episode suggested Vera has since been cutting back on his long working hours to spend more time with them. Toni was not seen again after she and Vera reconciled. A later episode established that although she eventually moved in with Vera, things didn't work out and Vera eventually had to find a new place to live.
- Andre Halstead (Oren Williams) (Season 4) is Toni Halstead's son who first meets Nick Vera when he was playing basketball outside Vera's apartment.
- Paul Cooper (Raymond J. Barry) (Seasons 6-7) is Lilly's father, who left the family when Lilly was six because of a toxic relationship with Lilly's mother and probably her drinking habit. He remarried to a woman named Celeste and relocated to Haddonfield, New Jersey, where he was an avid chess player. He and Celeste had two children, Maggie and Finn. Lilly only reconnected with Paul in season six (episode 06.11, "Wings"), though the two discussed several letters Paul sent to Lilly when she was sixteen. Paul carried a lot of guilt for leaving her, though he believed leaving her mother was the right thing to do because "some people just shouldn't stay together." In a letter to his daughter Paul admitted that he, like his ex-wife, was an alcoholic. Lilly agreed to meet Paul's family - her stepmother and half-siblings - but used work as an excuse to get out of it several times, whether she was actually working or not. When she finally did join the family for dinner, Celeste made it clear that she wanted Lilly and Paul to stop all the drama because, no matter how they all came together, they were family. Neither Paul nor Lilly brought up Christina in conversation, implying he was not Christina's father. In episode 07.21, "Almost Paradise", Lilly entered Paul's home to find Christina in the kitchen with him. Lilly stormed out but later met with Christina at a diner. Whether Paul is Christina's father or not, the two rarely talk.
- Finn Cooper (Brett Davern) (Season 7) is Paul's teenage son and Lilly's half-brother. Sometime after learning of Lilly's existence, he got himself arrested on a drunk and disorderly conduct charge in order to be taken to where she worked. Lilly told him there were easier ways if he wanted to see her and the two apparently began meeting soon after, with Lilly telling him more about their father's past. Months later, Finn stole Paul's car and ran away to Atlantic City after the two had an argument. Lilly would later help Paul find Finn, at which point Finn announced his intention to become a cop like her, rather than going to college.
- Ramiro Valens (Ismael 'East' Carlo) (Season 7) is Scotty's father. He approached his son for help after Scotty's mother Rosa was injured in a purse-snatching.
- Rosa Valens (Terri Hoyos) (Season 7) is Scotty's beloved mother who was victim of a robbery but eventually speaking with another victim confirms Scotty's suspicions that his mother was the victim of a serial rapist, who was caught and arrested by Scotty soon after.

=== Others ===
- Moe Kitchener (Daniel Baldwin) (Seasons 6-7) was an instructor at the Pennsylvania Military Institute in 2005, when female student Kate Butler was murdered by a fellow cadet. Moe assisted in covering up the crime by burying her body in Philly. When her remains were found four years later, Moe again tried to cover up the crime by running Lilly's car off a bridge. Lilly survived, however, and Moe was arrested. Lilly was later outraged when Moe was granted bail shortly thereafter, and began to wage a campaign of retaliation against Moe. Using her influence as a cop, she prevented him from obtaining a loan after he was dismissed from P.M.I., she had traffic officers place a boot on his car, and arranged to have him arrested on a DUI charge. Moe was later found dead in his car from a gunshot to the head. Lilly was questioned about the murder until Hank Butler, Kate's father, confessed to shooting Moe for his role in covering up his daughter's murder.
- Lindsey Dunlay (Bahni Turpin) (Season 1, 3) is social worker specializing in children and a friend of Lilly's since high school. She has twice asked the squad to help troubled teenagers by investigating the murders of their parents. She later returned to take custody of an abandoned baby found in the squad.
- Ryan Cavanaugh (Johnny Messner) (Season 7) is an FBI Agent who helped Lilly to identify the serial killer Paul Shepard. After having caught Sam, Ryan helped Lilly with another case (Ep. "Free Love").
- Diane Yates (Susanna Thompson) (Season 7) is another FBI and former PPD cop. In 1980, she was in the drive-in with her boyfriend Barry Jensen when he was shot. Diane goes to Philadelphia because her mother has a stroke. Stillman keeps her company at the hospital and comforts her when she passes away.
- George Marks (John Billingsley) (Season 2) was a serial killer of hideous intelligence, George was one of the few killers on the show to outwit Lilly and the squad, getting away with several murders over several years. Already troubled even as a child, his deranged mother, who suffered from hysterical blindness allowed a rapist to sexually assault him to save herself during a home invasion. Immediately after, George's mother became his first victim, using the gun the rapist knocked out of George's mother's hands. As an adult, George would cultivate a twisted obsession with strong women, using his position as a filing clerk with the Philadelphia Police Department to find examples of them in police reports (i.e. women who had been assaulted but had fought back against their attackers). Disguising himself as a cop, George would take these women (and on one occasion, a 14-year-old girl) into the woods, force them to strip down to their underwear, then proceed to hunt them using a pair of night vision goggles (much in the style of actual serial killer Robert Hansen) and an Arisaka Model 38 rifle. He implies to Vera and Jeffries that on occasion he would break the toes of his victims or cut off their feet to see how far they could run afterwards. He would collect their heads as trophies, burying their bodies in the woods and burying the heads in the backyard of his childhood home. He would also fit the eye sockets of the skulls with black glass deer eyes, presumably as a gesture to make his victims see what was done to him in the house. Though the squad quickly recognized George as being responsible for the murders, they were unable to get him to confess, or find enough evidence to convict him. Instead, he merely taunted them with personal information he had read from their police files, before walking away unpunished. During the interrogation, however, George developed a fixation with Lilly and, months later, would lure her to his home. It was here that he forced her to relive the assault that she experienced as a child, when her alcoholic mother forced her to go out into the night to buy alcohol for her whereupon along the way she was attacked and robbed. She then broke him down when she stripped away his god complex to show that in the woods he was still "a little boy whose mother didn't love him". It was then that both realised they were somewhat both cut from the same cloth, with George knowing he had found a worthy executioner as he pulled a gun on her and demanded she shoot him or else he would shoot her. A tense standoff would end with Lilly firing upon George, shooting him three times in the chest, killing him instantly. The entire ordeal would still haunt her months later.
