= Tyler Bensinger =

American film director

- Born: United States
- Occupations: Screenwriter, film director Television writer, producer
- Years active: 1995–present

Tyler Bensinger is an American film and television writer, producer and film director.

== Career ==
Bensinger grew up in Los Angeles and attended the Webb School of California. He earned his B.A. as an English Major at Yale before attending UCLA Film School where he received his MFA. He began his career writing features and wrote and directed the film Just Looking, starring James LeGros, Michelle Forbes, Steven Webber, Kurt Fuller and Marg Helgenberger. Bensinger moved from features to TV in the late nineties and has written on numerous shows including The Cape (1996), The Pretender, Beverly Hills 90210, Titans, Going to California, Dragnet, Cold Case, Justice, Viva Laughlin, Harper's Island, Parenthood, Prime Suspect, Masters of Sex, Nashville, The Good Wife, Notorious and This Is Us. He has been nominated for a Writers Guild of America Award (Masters of Sex) and an Emmy Award (This Is Us).

Bensinger is also a photographer. His monograph There and Away won first place in the International Photography Awards/Lucie Foundation competition in 2018. Bensinger's photographs have been featured twice in Lens' Magazine (issues 69 and 83).
