= Kathryn Morris =

American actress (born 1969)

- Born: Kathryn Susan Morris; January 28, 1969 (age 57); Cincinnati, Ohio, US
- Other name: Kathy Morris
- Occupation: Actress
- Years active: 1991–present
- Partner(s): Johnny Messner (separated; he married Avril Grace)
- Children: 2
- Website: thesavants.com/about

Kathryn Susan Morris (born January 28, 1969) is an American actress, best known for her lead role as Detective Lilly Rush in the CBS series Cold Case.

== Early life and education ==
Morris was born in Cincinnati, Ohio. She grew up Christian in Windsor Locks, Connecticut, with her parents, Stanley, a Bible scholar, and Joyce, an insurance agent, and five siblings before moving away. From age 6 to 17, Morris and her family traveled the southern 'Bible Belt' as a gospel group called 'The Morris Code'. The group was mainly made up of Morris's father and three (out of five) of her siblings.

She graduated from Enrico Fermi High School and, while there, attended the summer program at Wesleyan University's Center for Creative Youth. After studying theatre in high school, she was involved in a hit-and-run collision while on her way to her first acting gig, a Japanese music video based on the musical Grease. She still made it to the gig and that's when she knew she was going to be an actress. She attended two colleges in the Philadelphia metropolitan area, Northeastern Christian Junior College and Temple University, leaving Temple before graduating and moving to San Francisco.

== Career ==
Morris's first role was a minor one in the 1991 TV movie Long Road Home. Several other small parts followed, including a bit part as a psychiatric patient in the Oscar-winning As Good as It Gets. Her breakthrough role came as Lt. Annalisa "Stinger" Lindstrom in the television series Pensacola: Wings of Gold in 1997 for two seasons. Morris continued to work in films (notably ones directed by Rod Lurie) and had a brief stint on the Xena series in 1999 as Najara.

After seeing her in the film The Contender (which DreamWorks distributed), Steven Spielberg cast her in two successive films. Her scenes as a rock star in A.I. Artificial Intelligence required Morris to take intensive singing and guitar lessons, but were cut from the film by the director, which was particularly agonizing for her. In Minority Report, she portrayed the tormented wife of Tom Cruise's character.

In 2003, Morris won the lead role of detective Lilly Rush in the CBS dramatic series Cold Case. She also appeared in the 2004 films Mindhunters and Paycheck, opposite Ben Affleck, and more recently as the journalist wife of Josh Hartnett in Lurie's drama Resurrecting the Champ (2007). Morris appeared in the film Cougars, Inc. which was distributed in 2011. In 2012, Morris appeared in the Hallmark Channel movie The Sweeter Side of Life, a romantic comedy.

== Personal life ==
Morris was in a relationship with actor Johnny Messner. On April 8, 2013, Morris announced they were expecting twins. She gave birth to twin boys, who were diagnosed with autism when they were three years old. Messner and Morris broke up and he subsequently married Avril Grace. In October 2021, Morris launched The Savants, an initiative to "revolutionize how the world lives on and off the spectrum".

With Danny Pino, Morris made a public service announcement regarding postpartum depression as part of the CBS Cares campaign. Also, she was a spokesperson for the Sun Safety Alliance, an organization centered on fostering sun safety initiatives to reduce the risk of skin cancer.

In 2007, she drove in the Toyota Pro/Celebrity Race, and her hobbies include hiking and yoga.

== Filmography ==
=== Film ===
Year	Title	Role	Notes
1991	Cool as Ice	Jen	
1995	Sleepstalker	Megan	Direct-to-video
1996	Paper Dragons	Kate	
1996	The Prince	Emily	
1997	As Good as It Gets	Psychiatric Patient	
1998	The Prophecy II	Anxious Mother	Direct-to-video
1999	Screenplay	Fanny	
1999	Deterrence	Lizzie Woods	
2000	The Contender	Paige Willomina	
2001	A.I. Artificial Intelligence	Teenage Honey	
2001	The Last Castle	DOD Investigator	Scenes deleted
2002	Role of a Lifetime	Chelsea Cellini	
2002	Minority Report	Lara Anderton	
2002	Hostage	Linda Delacroix	Segment for the BMW short film series The Hire
2003	Paycheck	Rita Dunne	
2004	Mindhunters	Sara Moore	
2007	Resurrecting the Champ	Joyce Kernan	
2008	Assassination of a High School President	Nurse Platt	
2011	Cougars, Inc.	Alison	
2011	Moneyball	Billy Beane's Wife	Scenes deleted
2012	Sunday's Mother	Gillian	Short film
2013	The Coin	Rachael	Short film
2015	The Perfect Guy	Karen	
2015	Bone Tomahawk	Lorna Hunt	
2017	You Get Me	Mrs. Hewitt	
2019	The Dirt	Deana Richards	
2023	Hayseed	Joyce Metts	

=== Television ===
Year	Title	Role	Notes
1991	Long Road Home	Billy Jo Robertson	TV movie
1994	Rise and Walk: The Dennis Byrd Story	Angela	TV movie
1994	Oldest Living Confederate Widow Tells All	Zundro (Sandra)	TV movie
1994	Sweet Justice	Remy	Episode: "Pilot"
1994	A Friend to Die For	Monica Whitley	TV movie
1995	W.E.I.R.D. World	Lucy	TV movie
1995	Family Values	Borgyork Grumm	TV movie
1996	Murder, She Wrote	Doreen the Waitress	Episode: "What You Don't Know Can Kill You"
1996	L.A. Firefighters	Helen Regan	3 episodes
1996	Silk Stalkings	Judith Millay	Episode: "Compulsion"
1996	Relativity	Sylvie	Episode: "Pilot"
1996	Ink	Woman	Episode: "Above the Fold"
1997	Poltergeist: The Legacy	Laura Davis	Episode: "Silent Partner"
1997–1998	Pensacola: Wings of Gold	Stinger	Main role (season 1), 22 episodes
1998	Inferno	Ryan Ribbet	TV movie
1998–1999	Xena: Warrior Princess	Najara	Episodes: "Crusader", "The Convert"
1999	The Magnificent Seven	Charlotte Richmond	Episodes: "Wagon Train: Part 1", "Wagon Train: Part 2"
1999	Inherit the Wind	Rachel Brown	TV movie
1999	Providence	Molly	Episode: "The Third Thing"
2000	Hell Swarm	Allie	TV movie
2000	Murder, She Wrote: A Story to Die For	Patricia Williams	TV movie
2001	And Never Let Her Go	Anne Marie Fahey	TV movie
2001	The Mind of the Married Man	Sandy	4 episodes
2003–2010	Cold Case	Lilly Rush	Lead role, 156 episodes
2013	The Sweeter Side of Life	Desiree Harper	TV movie
2016	Colony	Charlotte Burgess	3 episodes
2018	Reverie	Monica Shaw	Series regular; 10 episodes
