= John Finn =

American actor (born 1952)

- Born: John Joseph Finn; September 30, 1952 (age 74); New York City, New York, U.S.
- Occupation: Actor
- Years active: 1979–present

John Joseph Finn (born September 30, 1952) is an American character actor known as one of the leads of the television programs Cold Case and EZ Streets. Finn has also had supporting roles in the films The Hunted (2003), Analyze That (2002), Catch Me If You Can (2002), True Crime (1999), Turbulence (1997), Blown Away (1994), The Pelican Brief (1993), and Glory (1989).

TV series that Finn has had recurring roles on include Dawson's Creek, The Practice, The X-Files, Strange World, NYPD Blue (he also appeared two other times on Blue as different characters), Chicago Hope, and eight episodes of Brooklyn South.

== Early life ==
Born to an Irish-American family in The Bronx, New York, he graduated from Eldred Central School in Eldred, New York, in the year 1970. He later joined the Navy for a few years, after which he entered the acting business.

== Filmography ==
=== Film ===
Year	Title	Role	Notes
1984	The Pope of Greenwich Village	Ginty	film debut
1984	Death Mask	1970, Reporter	
1988	Shakedown	The Bartender	
1989	Glory	Sergeant Major Mulcahy	
1990	Loose Cannons	Cop	credited as John J. Finn
1990	A Shock to the System	Motorman	
1990	Desperate Hours	Lexington	
1991	Cover Up	Jeff Cooper	
1993	Nowhere to Run	Cop In Chase	
1993	Cliffhanger	FBI Agent Michaels	
1993	Carlito's Way	Detective Duncan	
1993	Geronimo: An American Legend	Captain Hentig	
1993	The Pelican Brief	Matthew Barr	
1994	Being Human	Detective Cobb	
1994	Blown Away	Captain Roarke	
1996	City Hall	Commissioner Coonan	
1996	Hoist Away	—N/a	Short film; Director/Writer
1997	Turbulence	FBI Agent Frank Sinclair	
1997	Trojan War	Ben Kimble	
1999	True Crime	Reedy	
2002	Analyze That	Richard Chapin	
2002	Catch Me If You Can	FBI Assistant Director Marsh	
2003	The Hunted	FBI Special Agent Ted Chenoweth	
2003	The Human Stain	Louie Borero	
2006	Property	The Storyteller	Short film
2013	The Lifeguard	Jason "Big Jason"	
2014	The Gift	Sean Og	
2017	Gifted	Aubrey Highsmith	
2018	Bent	Driscoll	
2019	Finding Steve McQueen	W. Mark Felt	
2019	Ad Astra	Stroud	
2019	Saved Rounds	—N/a	Short film; Director/Producer pre-production
2025	Echo Valley	Randy	

=== Television ===
Year	Title	Role	Notes
1979	B.J. and the Bear	Forman	television debut Episode: "The Eyes of Texas"
1980	Rage!	Man #C	Television Movie
1981	The Incredible Hulk	Mechanic	Episode: "Fast Lane"
1982	Fame	Driver Cop	Episode: "Tomorrow's Farewell"
1982	The Fall Guy	Bleeker	Episode: "A Piece of Cake"
1982	The Fall Guy	Pete	Episode: "No Way Out"
1987	Spenser: For Hire	Monroe	Episode: "My Enemy, My Friend"
1987	Spenser: For Hire	Ken Green	Episode: "I Confess"
1987	Leg Work	Clauson	Episode: "The Art of Murder"
1988	Alone in the Neon Jungle	Alan Benson	Television Movie
1988	Miami Vice	Charles Hatch	Episode: "Hell Hath No Fury"
1988	Tattinger's	Mcintosh's Torpedo	Episode: "Pilot"
1989	A Man Called Hawk	Unknown	Episode: "The Master's Mirror"
1990	ABC Afterschool Specials	Unknown	Episode: "All That Glitters"
1990	Law & Order	Freddo Parisi	Episode: "Poison Ivy"
1991	Posing: Inspired by Three Real Stories	Jimmy Lanahan	Television Movie
1992	Quantum Leap	Admiral Spencer	Episode: "Running for Honor - June 11, 1964"
1992	Matlock	Sheriff Dewey	Episode: "The Outcast"
1992	Quicksand: No Escape	Detective Harris	credited as John Joseph Harris
1992	Street Justice	Unknown	Episode: "Eye Witness"
1992	Cheers	Mitch Ganzell	Episode: "Take Me Out of the Ball Game"
1992	Steel Justice	Lieutenant Bill Somes	Television Movie
1992	Lady Against the Odds	Lieutenant Donnelly	Television Movie
1992	Mario and the Mob	Unknown	Television Movie
1992	Citizen Cohn	Senator Charles Potter	Television Movie
1992	Flying Blind	Mr. Rickman	Episode: "Pilot"
1993	Frasier	Tim	Episode: "Miracle on Third or Fourth Street" credited as John J. Finn
1994	SeaQuest 2032	Colonel Schrader	Episode: "Nothing But the Truth"
1994-1995	Chicago Hope	Dr. Trevor Filburn	3 episodes; recurring role
1995	Truman	Bob Hannegan	Television Movie
1995	The Client	Waite Calhoun	Episode: "A Perfect World"
1995	Murderous Intent	Unknown	Television Movie
1995	Runaway One	Colonel Van Damme	Television Movie
1995	NYPD Blue	Jimmy "Socks" Matlow	Episode: "Dirty Socks"
1996	JAG	Major Klein	Episode: "Boot"
1996	Gone in the Night	Gerry Harbin	Television Movie
1996	Nash Bridges	FBI Special Agent Elliot Rose	Episode: "Aloha Bash"
1996	Crazy Horse	General George Crook	Television Movie
1996-1997	EZ Streets	Captain Geary	11 episodes; recurring role
1997	Promised Land	Frank Boller	Episode: "The Getaway"
1997	Millennium	William Garry	Episode: "Covenant"
1997	Invasion	Airbase Colonel Brown (uncredited)	Miniseries
1997	Players	Lieutenant Mike Harper	Episode: "Rashocon"
1997	NYPD Blue	Lieutenant John Shanon	2 episodes
1997-1999	The X-Files	Michael Kritschgau	5 episodes; recurring role
1998	Brooklyn South	Officer Ray MacElwaine	8 episodes; recurring role
1999	Strange World	FBI Special Agent Richard H. Hoffman	2 episodes
1999	Atomic Train	Wally Phister	Miniseries; 2 episodes
1999	Seasons of Love	Gorm Schrader	2 episodes
1999-2003	Dawson's Creek	Sheriff John Witter	4 episodes; recurring role
2000	The Practice	Detective Henry Dokes	2 episodes
2000	Deadlocked	Jack Fisque	Television Movie
2000	Rocket's Red Glare	Wyatt Claybourne	Television Movie
2001	Cover Me: Based on the True Life of an FBI Family	Nathan Martson	Episode: "The River"
2001	NYPD Blue	Jimmy McElroy	Episode: "Nariz a Nariz"
2001	Philly	Frank Maguire	Episode: "Light My Fire"
2002	Shadow Realm	Malone	Television Movie
2002	Thieves	George Lieser	Episode: "Home Is Where the Heist Is"
2002	Night Visions	Malone	Episode: "Patters/Voices" (segment: Voices)
2002	Without a Trace	Abner Harrington	Episode: "In Extremis"
2003-2010	Cold Case	John Stillman	series regular; 156 episodes/Director; 2 episodes Episode: "Wednesday's Women" (2008); Episode: "The Runaway Bunny" (2010)
2011-2017	NCIS	General (former Marine Commandant) Charles T. Ellison	3 episodes
2012	Blue Bloods	David Cummings	Episode: "Leap of Faith"
2012	Suits	Lawrence Kemp	2 episodes
2012	Homeland	Rex Henning	Episode: "The Clearing"
2013	Golden Boy	Ed McKenzie	Episode: "McKenzie on Fire"
2014	Believe	Mr. Tate	Episode: "Sinking"
2014	Madam Secretary	Allen Bollings	Episode: "Blame Canada"
2014	An Bronntanas	Sean Og	Miniseries, 5 episodes
2014	Wall Street	Ritter	Television Movie
2015	The Blacklist	Judge Richard Denner	2 episodes
2016	Elementary	Neil Dannon	Episode: "Down Where the Dead Delight"
2016	The Good Wife	Oren Cleary	Episode: "Targets"
2017	Doubt	Don Wilson	Episode: "Pilot"
2018-2020	The Walking Dead	Earl Sutton	11 episodes
2018	The Enemy Within	Richard Bregman	Episode: "Pilot"
2019	The Loudest Voice	Jack Welch	Miniseries, 1 episode
2019	The Crown	Arthur "Bull" Hancock	Episode: "Coup"
2021	Arctic Circle	Gordon Merriman	Season 2, 6 episodes
2024	FBI: Most Wanted	Jackson Chase	Episode: "White Buffalo"
