= Jeremy Ratchford =

Canadian actor (born 1965)

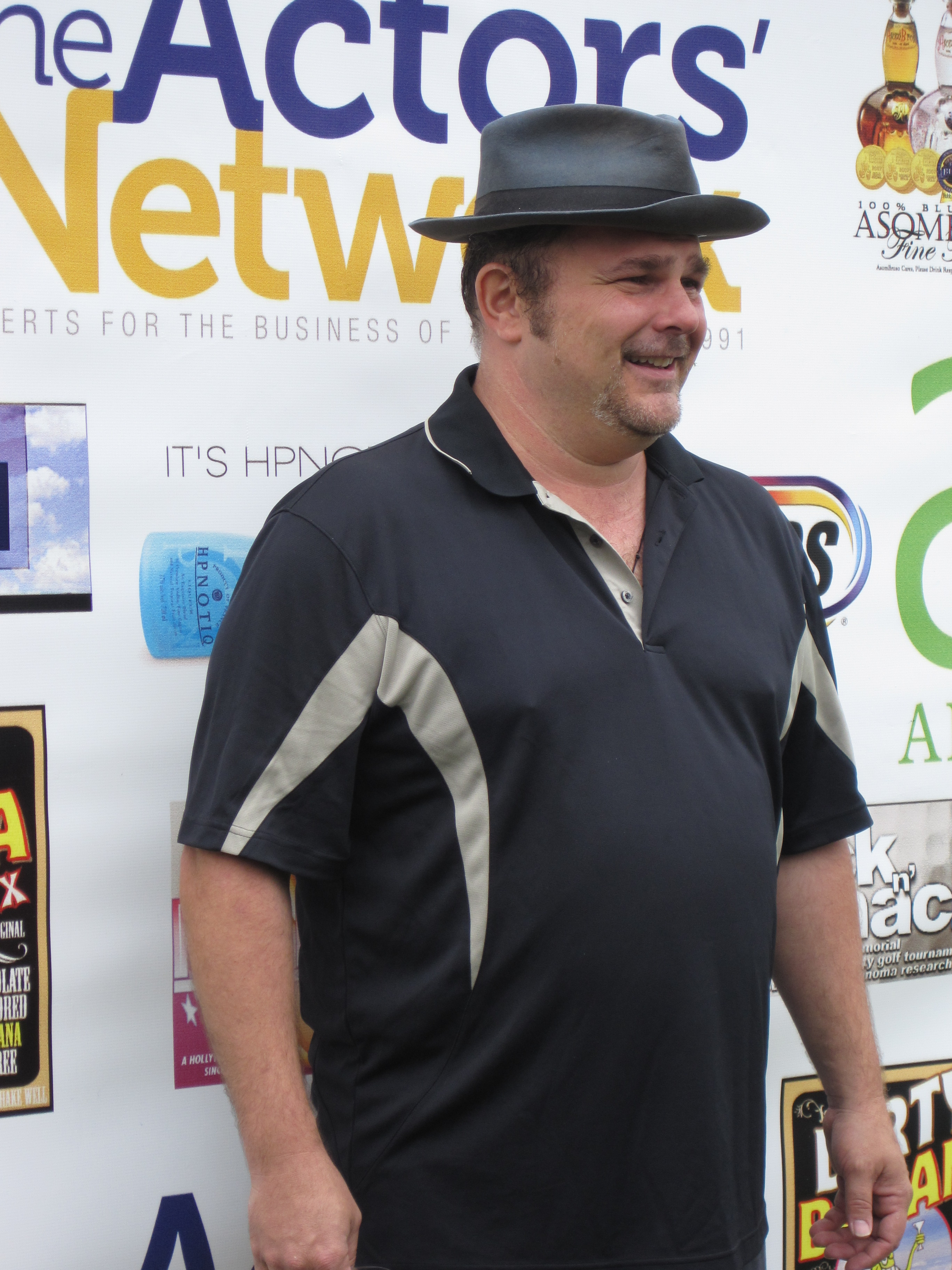
- Ratchford at the 8th Annual Hack n' Smack Celebrity Golf Tournament in 2011
- Born: August 6, 1965 (age 61); Kitchener, Ontario, Canada
- Occupation: Actor
- Years active: 1985–present
- Spouse: Tori Ratchford (m. 2002; div. approx. 2018)
- Children: 3

Jeremy Ratchford (born August 6, 1965) is a Canadian actor. He starred as Nick Vera on the TV series Cold Case.

== Early life ==
Ratchford was born in Kitchener, Ontario, on August 6, 1965. He studied acting at Kitchener-Waterloo Collegiate and Vocational School, from which he graduated.

== Career ==
While in Canada, Ratchford played Marvel Comic book character Banshee in the live action TV super hero film Generation X. Ratchford also starred in a series of Canadian Crispy Crunch candy bar commercials.

When he relocated to Hollywood, California, he played a sexual predator on an episode of NYPD Blue and two episodes of The Practice, as well as the vampire Lyle Gorch in the Buffy the Vampire Slayer episodes "Bad Eggs" and "Homecoming" before being cast on Cold Case. On Cold Case, he played detective Nick Vera.

== Personal life ==
Ratchford has three sons from his marriage to Tori: Dexton, Revel and Wylder.

In 2017, he sold his then estate, a house that was built in the 1940s with 2,900 square feet of living space in Valley Village, Los Angeles, for $1.38 million.

== Filmography ==
=== Film ===
Year	Title	Role	Notes
1985	Hot Water	Junior	film debut
1986	The Vindicator	Lead Biker	
1987	Hearts of Fire	Jim "Jimbo"	
1988	Short Circuit 2	Bill	
1989	Prom Night III: The Last Kiss	Leonard Welsh	Direct-to-Video
1991	The Events Leading Up to My Death	The Fireman	
1992	Unforgiven	Deputy Andy Russell	
1993	Change of Heart	Felix	
1994	Small Gifts		
1996	The Stupids	Soldier	
1996	Fly Away Home	Glen Seifert	
2000	The Crew	Young Mike "The Brick" Donatelli	
2001	Angel Eyes	Ray Micigliano	
2001	Century Hotel	The Nightfly	
2002	The Barber	Sheriff Corgan	
2008	Leatherheads	Eddie	
2008	Immigrants (L.A. Dolce Vita)	Additional Voices (voice role)	English version
2009	Shipping and Receiving	Glen Allen	Short film
2011	Robbed	Detective Flynn	Short film
2011	The New Republic	Agent Livingston	
2013	Lost on Purpose	Phill Noff	
2014	Jersey Boys	Police Officer	
2015	Death Valley	Lucas Kern	
2017	Small Town Crime	"Orthopedic"	
2017	Radio 88	"Danger" Dickie Defozzio	Short film
2018	Dead Women Walking	Bill	
2018	First Timers	T.J.	
2018	Give Till It Hurts	Elvis	
2020	The Way Back	Matty	
2024	Red Right Hand	Dominic	

=== Television ===
Year	Title	Role	Notes
1985	Check It Out	Brandon	television debut Episode: "Skip to the Loo"
1986	Walt Disney's Wonderful World of Color	Todd	Episode: "Young Again"
1986	As Is	Pickup #1	Television Movie
1986	Hangin' In	Hit Man	Episode: "Hit Man Kate"
1986	Easy Prey	Billy	Television Movie
1986	The Truth About Alex	"Dutch"	Television Movie
1986–1987	The Lawrenceville Stories	Charley DeSoto	Television Miniseries; 3 episodes
1986–1990	The Campbells	"Ox"	8 episodes; recurring role
1987	American Playhouse	Charley DeSoto	Episode: "The Prodigious Hickey"
1987	CBS Schoolbreak Special	Luke	Episode: "The Day They Came to Arrest the Book"
1987	Night Heat	Doyle	2 episodes
1988	T and T	Bob Douglas	Episode: "The Drop"
1988	Diamonds	Unknown	Episode: "Man with a Gun"
1988	Alfred Hitchcock Presents	Tom	Episode: "Fogbound"
1988	War of the Worlds	Student	Episode: "Goliath Is My Name"
1988	9B	Frankie Mitchell	2 episodes
1989	Street Legal	Mark Leeson	Episode: "Brotherhoods"
1991	Counterstrike	Jeremy	Episode: "Hidden Assets"
1991	Rin Tin Tin: K-9 Cop	Unknown	Episode: "Light at the End of the Tunnel" also known as "Katts and Dog"
1991	Top Cops	Tom Kennedy	Episode: "Tom Kennedy/Eddie Perez and Raul Alviso/Danny Miller"
1992	A Savage Christmas: The Fall of Hong Kong	Fred Reich	Television Documentary
1992	Top Cops	Jim Gorry	Episode: "Freddie Williams/Jim Gorry/Bruno Pezzulich"
1992	Beyond Reality	Unknown	Episode: "Master of Darkness"
1992	Secret Service	DeMarco	Episode: "Curiosity Killed the Cat/Murder, He Broke"
1992–1996	X-Men	Additional voices	15 episodes;
1993	Secret Service	Lombardi	Episode: "Brothers in Arms"
1993	Matrix	Eddie Mayberry	Episode: "Death and Taxes"
1993	Street Legal	Jeffrey Sinclair	2 episodes
1993	The Kids in the Hall	Rookie	Episode: "#4.10"
1994	Getting Gotti	Harvey Sanders	Television Movie
1994	RoboCop	J.J. Biddle	Episode: "When Justice Fails"
1994	Small Gifts	Evan	Television Movie; Nominated - Gemini Award for Best Lead Actor in a Dramatic Program or Miniseries (1996)
1994–1995	The Busy World of Richard Scarry	Unknown (voice role)	4 episodes; recurring role
1995	Lonesome Dove: The Series	Travis	Episode: "Blood Money"
1995	The Shamrock Conspiracy	Johnny McQueen	Television Movie
1995	TekWar	Logan	Episode: "Cyberhunt"
1995	Convict Cowboy	Bob	Television Movie
1995	Where's the Money, Noreen?	Satterfield	Television Movie
1996	Generation X	Sean Cassidy	Television Movie
1996	Moonshine Highway	Dwayne Dayton	Television Movie
1996	Mortal Kombat: Defenders of the Realm	Smoke (voice role)	Episode: "Old Friends Never Die"
1997	Home Invasion	Raymond	Television Movie
1997	The Sentinel	Artie Parkman	Episode: "The Girl Next Door"
1997	Aaahh!!! Real Monsters	Shadowy Figure (voice role)	Episode: "Spy vs. Monster/Misery Date"
1997	Peacekeepers	Sergeant Conrad Bitner	Television Movie
1997	The Practice	Gibbons	Episode: "Hide and Seek"
1998	The Outer Limits	Sergeant Adam Sears	Episode: "Relativity Theory"
1998	Brooklyn South	Robert Standley	Episode: "Doggonit"
1998	Pensacola: Wings of Gold	Seaton Palmer	Episode: "Not in My Backyard"
1998	Buffy the Vampire Slayer	Lyle Gorch	2 episodes
1999	JAG	Lewis Beecham	Episode: "Rivers' Run"
1999	Turks	Tony	Episode: "Lend My Your Ears"
1999	Walker, Texas Ranger	Maxwell	Episode: "Brothers in Arms"
1999	Poltergeist: The Legacy	Jimmy Boyle	Episode: "Brother's Keeper"
2000	The Magnificent Seven	Jack "Handsome Jack" Averal	Episode: "Obsession"
2000	The Wild Thornberrys	Alligator (voice role)	Episode: "Time Flies"
2000	Blacktop	Mechanic	Television Movie
2001	The Sports Pages	Unknown	Television Movie; segment "The Heidi Bowl"
2001–2003	Blue Murder	Detective Jack Pogue	series regular; 39 episodes Nominated - Gemini Award for Best Lead Actor in a Continuing Dramatic Role (2001, 2003)
2002	The Practice	Gavin Brown	Episode: "The Test"
2002	CSI: Crime Scene Investigation	Tommy Sconzo	Episode: "Primim Non Nocere"
2002	NYPD Blue	Darryl Marquette	Episode: "Low Blow"
2003–2010	Cold Case	Nick Vera	series regular; 156 episodes
2008	Comanche Moon	Charlie Goodnight	Television Miniseries; Episode: "#1.3"
2010	One Angry Juror	Don Burston	Television Movie
2011	Shameless	Detective Bernero	Episode: "Father Frank, Full of Grace"
2011	Hawaii Five-0	Chet	Episode: "Alaheo Pau'ole"
2012	Perception	Detective Hammond	Episode: "Pilot"
2012	It's Always Sunny in Philadelphia	Detective	Episode: "The Maureen Ponderosa Wedding Massacre"
2015	The Mentalist	George Hoilday	Episode: "Little Yellow House"
2015	Bones	ATM	Episode: "The Eye in the Sky"
2015	Longmire	Rett Jacky	Episode: "War Eagle"
2015	NCIS	Detective Ramsey Malone	Episode: "Day in Court"
2016	Workaholics	Frank	Episode: "Always Bet on Blake"
2016	Chicago P.D.	Jim	Episode: "300,000 Likes"
2017	NCIS: New Orleans	Richard Marino	Episode: "NOLA Confidential"
2017	Criminal Minds: Beyond Borders	Boris	Episode: "The Ripper of Riga"
2018	Taken	Detective Lyons	Episode: "Absalom"
2019-2025	Hudson and Rex	Rupert Mankiewicz	3 episodes
2024	FBI	Detective John Lettieri	1 episode
2025	Saint-Pierre	Sgt. Quint Boone	1 episode
2026	Ted	Bar Patron	1 episode
