= Thom Barry =

American actor

- Born: Cincinnati, Ohio, US
- Occupations: Actor; disc jockey
- Years active: 1995–2016
- Known for: Portraying Will Jeffries on the TV series Cold Case

Thom Barry is an American former actor who was born in Cincinnati, Ohio. In the 1980s, he was a disc jockey for WUBE-FM in Cincinnati. He appeared in television advertisements for The Home Depot, Sears, and United Parcel Service, and did voice acting for the TV series The Incredible Hulk and The Wild Thornberrys. In 2014, The Hollywood Reporter described the actor as best known for playing Detective Will Jeffries on the TV series Cold Case from 2003 to 2010.

== Acting credits ==
=== Television ===
Year	Title	Role	Episode(s)	Citation(s)
1995	Seinfeld	Building superintendent	"The Soup Nazi"	
1996	Living Single	Mark	"Doctor in the House"	
1996–1997	The Incredible Hulk	Gabe Jones (voice)	Recurring role (8 episodes)	
1998	Profiler	Governor of Ohio	"Shoot to Kill"	
1999	The Wild Thornberrys	Jimal (voice)	"Dances with Dingoes"	
1999–2003	The West Wing	Mark Richardson	2 episodes	
1999–2003	The Practice	Judge Watson	3 episodes	
2000	Get Real	Detective Oberg	"Saved"	
2000	The Pretender	Leonard	"Meltdown"	
2000	Family Law	Judge Harbert	"Going Home"	
2001	The Education of Max Bickford	Garvis Avery	2 episodes	
2003–2010	Cold Case	Will Jeffries	156 episodes	
2008–2009	Crash	Captain Tucker		
2011	House	Sykes	"Twenty Vicodin"	
2013	Blue Bloods	ADA Saul Ward	"Framed"	
2014	Perception	William Parsons	Recurring	

=== Film ===
Year	Title	Role	Citation(s)
1995	The American President	Guard	
1995	White Man's Burden	Landlord	
1995	Congo	Samahani	
1995	Apollo 13	Orderly	
1996	High School High	Teacher	
1996	Independence Day	SETI Tech Two	
1996	Space Jam	James R. Jordan Sr.	
1997	Steel	Senior Cop	
1997	Air Force One	Ramstein S O F Watch Officer	
1998	Major League: Back to the Minors	Frank "Pops" Morgan	
2001	The Fast and the Furious	Agent Bilkins	
2003	2 Fast 2 Furious	Agent Bilkins	
2013	Texas Chainsaw 3D	Sheriff Hooper	
2016	Mr. Church	Frankie Twiggs	
