= Danny Pino =

American actor (born 1974)

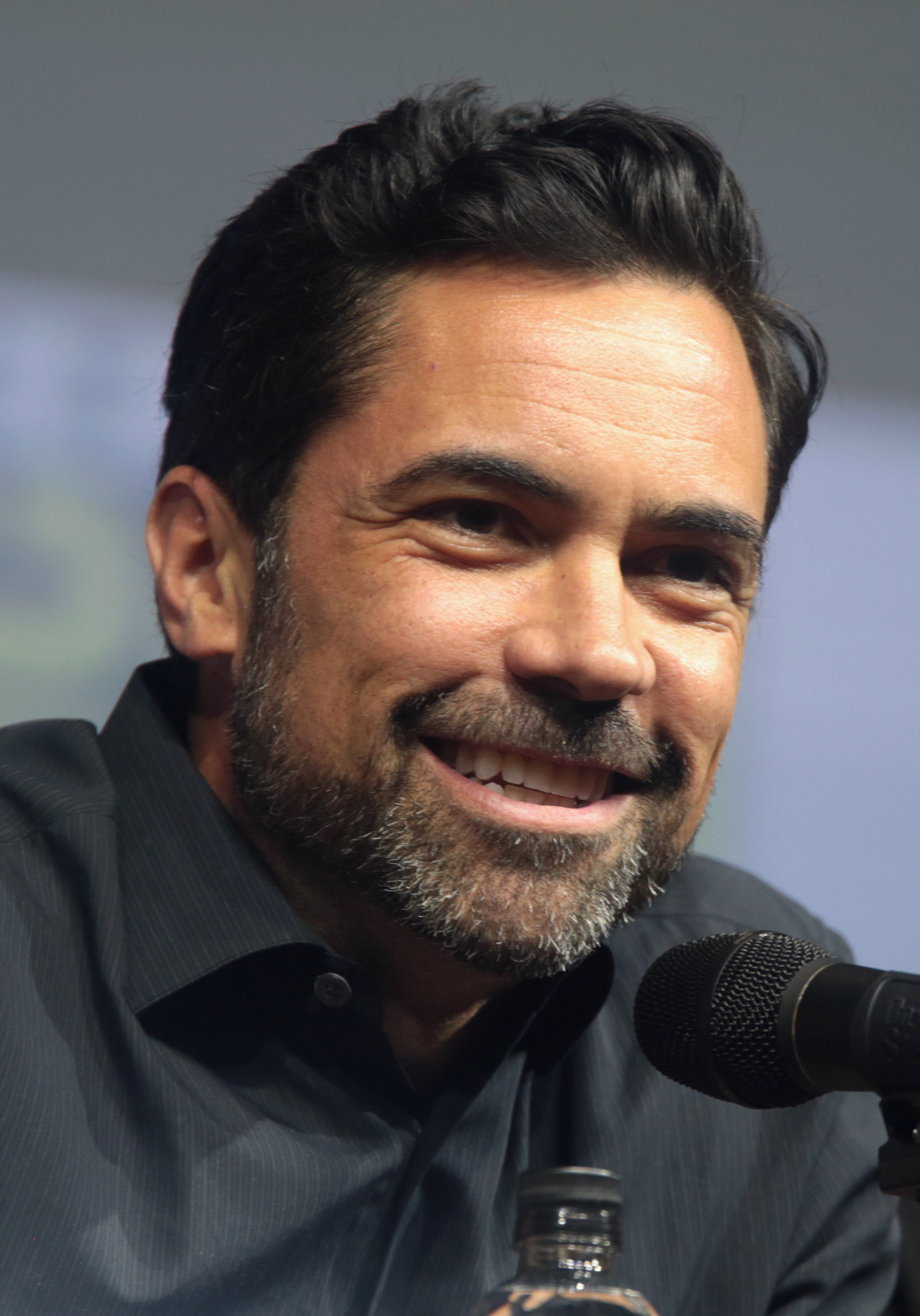
- Pino at the 2018 San Diego Comic-Con
- Born: Daniel Gonzalo Pino; April 15, 1974 (age 52); Miami, Florida, U.S.
- Education: Florida International University (BA); New York University (MFA)
- Occupation: Actor
- Years active: 2001–present
- Spouse: Lilly Bernal (m. 2002)
- Children: 2

Daniel Gonzalo Pino (born April 15, 1974) is an American actor who starred as Detective Scotty Valens on the CBS series Cold Case from 2003 to 2010, and as NYPD Detective Nick Amaro in the long-running NBC crime drama Law & Order: Special Victims Unit from 2011 to 2015. In 2002, he appeared in London's West End in Up for Grabs with Madonna. In May 2003, Pino played Desi Arnaz in a CBS special on the life of Lucille Ball, Lucy. He played drug cartel leader Miguel Galindo on Mayans M.C. which airs on FX, and FBI agent John Bishop in procedural crime drama Gone.

== Early years and education ==
Named after his grandfather, Pedro Gonzalo de Armas, Pino was born in Miami, Florida, to Cuban parents. He attended Rockway Middle School and graduated from Miami Coral Park High School in 1992, and from Florida International University in 1996. He also attended New York University's Graduate Acting Program at the Tisch School of the Arts, graduating in 2000.

== Career ==
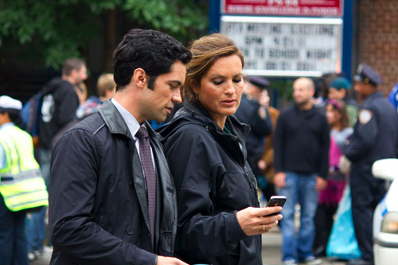
Pino and Mariska Hargitay filming SVU

Pino is known for his performance as the Mexican drug lord Armadillo Quintero on FX's The Shield. He has also appeared in the films The Lost City (2005) and Flicka (2006), which featured Tim McGraw, and starred in the hit CBS series Cold Case as Detective Scotty Valens. In 2011, Pino joined the cast of Law & Order: Special Victims Unit for its 13th season, along with Chase actress Kelli Giddish, coinciding with Christopher Meloni's departure. On SVU, Pino portrayed NYPD Detective Nick Amaro, a detective transferring from the narcotics squad to the Special Victims Unit.

Pino wrote two episodes of Cold Case: "Stealing Home" and "Metamorphosis". Starting in 2005, he has been in six CBS Cares public service announcements, with other stars of CBS original programs. He has made single appearances on The Sharon Osbourne Show in 2004, The Late Late Show with Craig Ferguson in 2005, The Drop in 2005, Entertainment Tonight in 2008, and The Ellen DeGeneres Show in 2011. In 2016, he played Alex Vargas in Scandal and Democratic Senator Luke Healy in BrainDead.

In 2017, he joined the cast of the procedural crime drama series Gone, as FBI agent John Bishop, alongside Chris Noth and Leven Rambin. He currently co-stars in FX's Sons of Anarchy spinoff series Mayans M.C., as cartel leader Miguel Galindo.

In August 2020, he joined the cast of Stephen Chbosky's film adaptation of the broadway musical Dear Evan Hansen as Larry Murphy, a role that was re-conceived for the film from "father" to "stepfather," with the character renamed as Larry Mora.

== Personal life ==
Pino is fluent in Spanish as evidenced by TV shows such as Cold Case and Mayans M.C., and interviews he has done.

Pino and his wife, Lilly, married February 15, 2002. They have two sons, Luca Daniel, born February 15, 2006, and Julian Franco, born June 5, 2007.

== Filmography ==
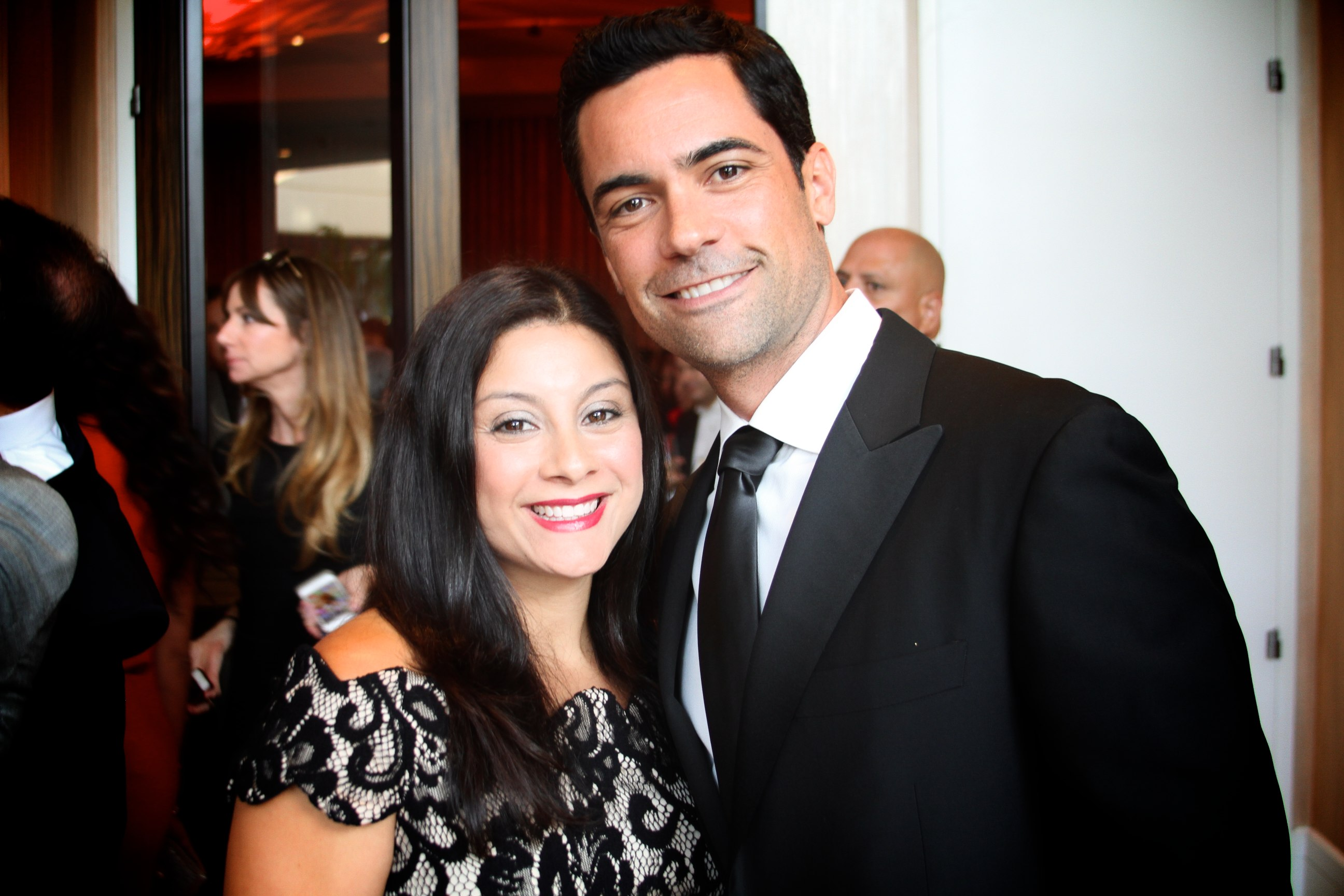
Pino at the 2014 Imagen Awards with his wife Lilly

=== Film ===
Year	Title	Role	Notes
2005	Between	Victor	
2005	Rx	Carlos	
2005	The Lost City	Alberto Mora	
2006	Flicka	Jack	
2008	The Burning Plain	Santiago	
2009	Across the Hall	Terry	
2010	Across the Line: The Exodus of Charlie Wright	Gabriel Garza	
2018	Mayans M.C.	Miguel Galindo	Video short
2020	Fatale	Carter Heywood	
2021	Vivo	Bus Passenger (voice)	
2021	Dear Evan Hansen	Larry Mora	

=== Television ===
Year	Title	Role	Notes
2001–2002	Men, Women & Dogs	Clay	Guest star, 13 episodes
2002	Point of Origin	Burn Victim	TV movie
2003	The Shield	Armadillo Quintero	Guest star, 4 episodes
2003	Lucy	Desi Arnaz	TV movie
2003–2010	Cold Case	Detective Scotty Valens	Series regular, 151 episodes
2004	NYPD 2069	Eddie Vega	TV movie
2007	CSI: NY	Detective Scotty Valens	Cold Case crossover, 1 episode
2010	Burn Notice	Adam Scott	Guest star, 2 episodes
2011	Metro	Douglas Romero	TV movie
2011–2015, 2021	Law & Order: Special Victims Unit	Detective Nick Amaro	Main role, guest star
2014–2015	Chicago P.D.	Detective Nick Amaro	2 episodes
2016	BrainDead	Luke Healy	Main Role
2016	Scandal	Alejandro Vargas	Recurring role
2017–2018	Gone	John Bishop	Main role
2018–2023	Mayans M.C.	Miguel Galindo	Main role
2019	One Day at a Time	Tito	Netflix, Guest star, 2 episodes
2021	The Good Fight	Ricardo Diaz	Episode: "And the Firm Had Two Partners..."
2024	Hotel Cocaine	Roman Compte	8 episodes
2024	Accused	Jake Harris	1 episode
TBA	The Magnificent Seven	Santiago “Santi” Vega	Main role

== Awards and nominations ==
Pino has won two awards so far and has been nominated for five, all from his work on Cold Case and Law & Order: Special Victims Unit.

Year	Award	Category	Result	Notes
2005	Imagen Award	Best Supporting Actor—Television	Nominated	Cold Case
2006	Imagen Award	Best Actor—Television	Nominated	Cold Case
2008	ALMA Award	Outstanding Actor in a Drama Television Series	Nominated	Cold Case
2009	ALMA Award	Outstanding Actor in a Drama Television Series	Nominated	Cold Case
2010	Imagen Award	Best Actor—Television	Won	Cold Case
2012	ALMA Award	Outstanding Actor in a Drama Television Series	Nominated	Law & Order: Special Victims Unit
2015	Imagen Award	Best Supporting Actor-Television	Won	Law & Order: Special Victims Unit
