= Evolution (disambiguation) =

Evolution is a general term for change over time, and may refer to:

== In science ==
- Biological evolution
- Cultural evolution (disambiguation)
- Evolutionary algorithm, the use of evolutionary concepts in computing
- Universal Darwinism, the application of evolutionary concepts across domains

== Entertainment ==
=== Film and television ===
- Evolution (1971 film), Canadian animated short by Michael Mills
- Evolution (2001 film), American comic science fiction film by Ivan Reitman
- Evolution (2015 film), French horror-thriller film
- Evolution (2021 film), Hungarian drama film
- "Evolution" (Star Trek: The Next Generation), 1989 episode of Star Trek: The Next Generation
- "Evolution" (Stargate SG-1), pair of episodes of Stargate SG-1
- Evolution (TV series), 2002 documentary series
- "Evolution" (The Walking Dead), 2018 episode of The Walking Dead
- Pokémon Evolutions, a 2021 Japanese animated miniseries

=== Other uses in entertainment ===
- Evolution (advertisement), 2006 promotion for Dove cosmetic soap
- Evolution (Guinness) or noitulovE, 2005–2006 Guinness advertising campaign
- Evolution (professional wrestling), professional wrestling stable in WWE
- WWE Evolution, WWE pay-per-view offering
- Evolution (AJPW), professional wrestling stable
- Evolution (ride), amusement-park ride
- Evolution (radio show)

== Literature ==
- Evolution (Peel novel), 1994 Doctor Who novel by John Peel
- Evolution (journal), bimonthly scientific journal
- Evolution (Baxter novel), 2003 science fiction novel by Stephen Baxter
- Evolution: The Modern Synthesis, 1942 popular science book by Julian Huxley
- Evolution: The Story of Life, 2009 non-fiction book by Douglas Palmer

== Music ==
=== Albums and EPs ===
- Evolution (Anastacia album) (2017)
- Evolution (Blood on the Dance Floor album) (2012)
- Evolution (Boyz II Men album) (1997)
- Evolution (Decoded Feedback album)
- Evolution (Dennis Coffey album)
- Evolution (Disturbed album) (2018)
- Evolution (Edge of Sanity album) (1999)
- Evolution (Ghost Town album) (2015)
- Evolution (Grachan Moncur III album) (1963)
- Evolution (Hed PE album)
- Evolution (Hollies album) (1967)
- Evolution (Infinite EP)
- Evolution (JLS album)
- Evolution (Journey album) (1979)
- Evolution (Magnum album) (2011)
- Evolution (Malo album) (1973)
- Evolution (Martina McBride album)
- Evolution (Masami Okui album) (2006)
- Evolution (Memorain album) (2012)
- Evolution (Nektar album) (2004)
- Evolution (Noiseworks album) (2022)
- Evolution (Oleta Adams album) (1993)
- Evolution (Once Human album) (2017)
- Evolution (Open Hand EP) (2000)
- Evolution (Paul van Dyk album) (2012)
- Evolution (Sabrina Carpenter album) (2016)
- Evolution (Scotch album) (1985)
- Evolution (Sheryl Crow album) (2024)
- Evolution (Slum Village album) (2013)
- Evolution (Subhumans EP)
- Evolution (Teddy Charles album) (1955)
- Evolution (Tony MacAlpine album) (1995)
- Evolution (Twins album) (2003)
- Evolution (Viper album) (1992), or its title song
- Evolution: The Hits, compilation album by Dead or Alive
- Evolution, 1993 album by Geoff Moore and the Distance
- Evolution, 1994 album by Geoffrey Downes
- Evolution, 2012 album by Pamela Williams
- Evolution, 2019 extended play by Excision and Wooli
- Evolution, 2019 extended play by Jake Zyrus

=== Songs ===
- "Evolution" (Ayumi Hamasaki song) (2001)
- "Evolution" (Korn song) (2007)
- "Evolution", by Cat Power from You Are Free (2003)
- "Evolution", by Roy Ayers from Mystic Voyage (1975)
- "Evolution", by State Radio from Let It Go (2009)
- "Evolution (The Grand Design)", by Symphony X from V – The New Mythology Suite (2000)
- "Evolution", by The Word Alive from Life Cycles (2012)
- "Evolution" (Hardy), by Edward W. Hardy (2016)
- "Evolution", by Fred Frith from Cheap at Half the Price (1983)

=== Other uses in music ===
- Evolution Festival, festival held in Tyne and Wear from 2002 until 2013

== Games ==
- Evolution: The Origin of Species, 2010 card game published by Rightgames RBG
- Evolution (board game), 2014, by North Star Games
- Evolution Championship Series, yearly fighting game tournament
- Evolution: The Game of Intelligent Life, 1997 strategy game edited by Discovery Channel
- Evolution: The World of Sacred Device, 1999 video game
- CycloDS Evolution, Nintendo DS hardware for home brew games

== Companies ==
- Evolution AB, Swedish gaming technology company
- Evolution Aircraft, American aircraft manufacturer based in Redmond, Oregon
- Evolution Group (UK), British financial services business
- Evolution Group (South Africa), South African financial services business
- Evolution Studios, British video game developer
- Evolutions Television, British television post-production company

== Technology ==
- Beagle 2: Evolution, proposed successor to the Beagle 2 Mars lander
- DTA Evolution, French ultralight trike design
- Evolution (marketplace), black market operating on the Tor network
- Evolution (software), email client and calendar software
- Evolution engine, motorcycle engine from Harley-Davidson
- Mitsubishi Lancer Evolution, sports car
- MCV Evolution, single-deck bus
- EVolution, research project to reduce vehicle weight
- Ultima Evolution, a British sports car

== See also ==
- Evilution (disambiguation)
- The Evolution (disambiguation)
