= Chadwick Stokes Urmston =

American musician (born 1976)

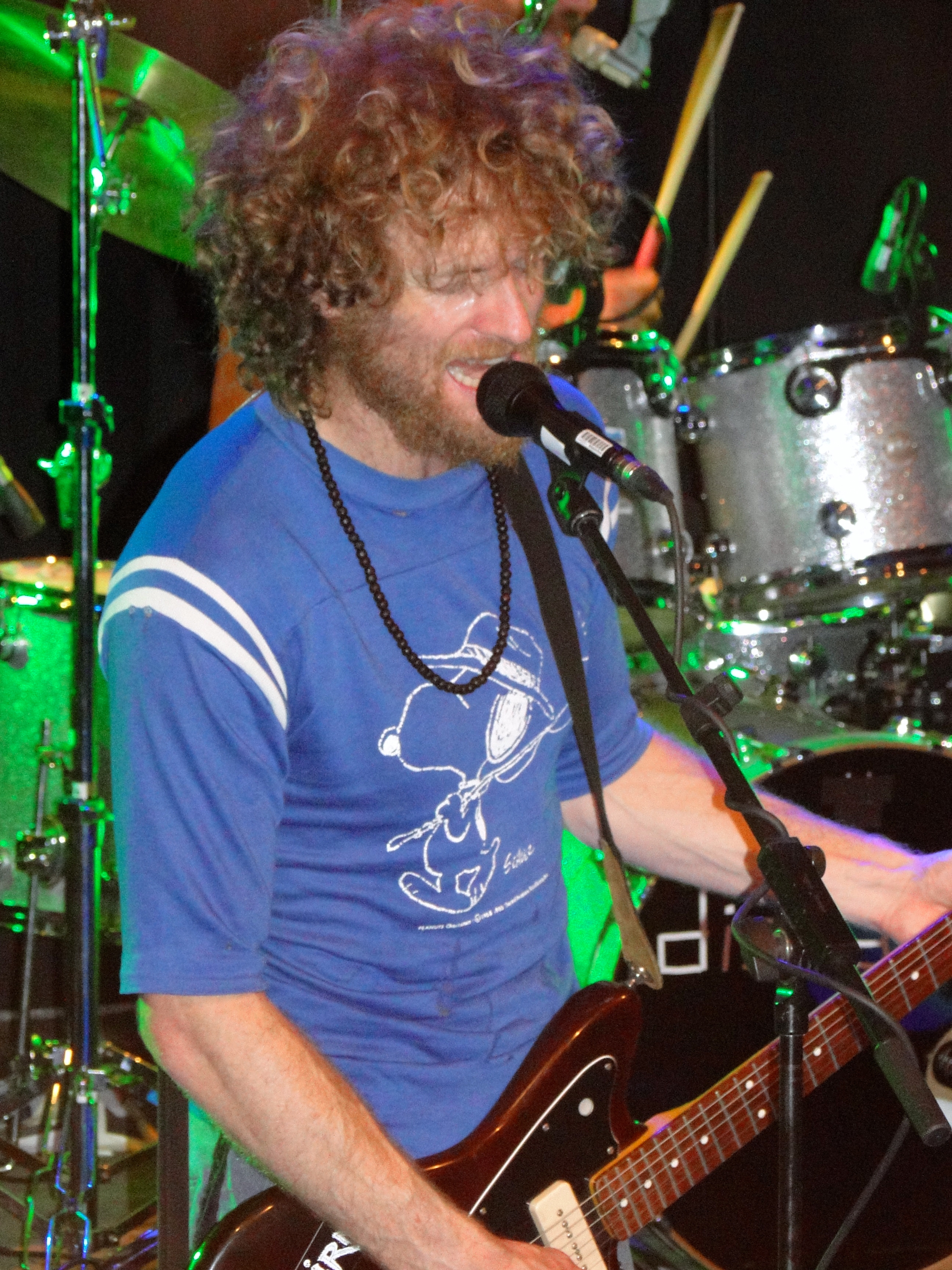

Background information
- Born: Charles Stokes Urmston; February 26, 1976 (age 50)
- Origin: Sherborn, Massachusetts, US
- Genres: Rock, reggae, funk, acoustic, Ska
- Occupation: Musician
- Instruments: Electric guitar, acoustic guitar, electric bass (with Dispatch), trombone, djembe, harmonica, piano
- Years active: 1994–present
- Member of: Dispatch; State Radio
- Formerly of: Hermit Thrush
- Website: chadwickstokes.com

Charles Stokes Urmston (born February 26, 1976), better known as Chadwick Stokes, is an American musician and a human rights activist. He is the frontman for the Boston-area bands Dispatch and State Radio, and released solo music under the name Chadwick Stokes.

== Early life and education ==
Charles Stokes Urmston was born February 26, 1976, in Boston, Massachusetts, into a large family. He graduated from Dover-Sherborn High School in 1994, and went on to attend both Middlebury College and NYU. During this time, Urmston briefly lived in Zimbabwe, where he befriended a local fieldworker named Elias. Later, Urmston wrote a song titled "Elias" for Dispatch's 1996 album "Silent Steeples", which became one of their most well known songs. Many of his songs also reference where he grew up going in the summer, West Chop, Massachusetts.

== Career ==
See Dispatch for a complete history of the band.

In 1995, while attending Middlebury College, Urmston met Pete Heimbold and formed the band Hermit Thrush.

He later formed a band called One Fell Swoop with Heimbold and Brad Corrigan; this group would ultimately become known as Dispatch. They quickly gained a huge grassroots college following and achieved unprecedented success in the music industry independent of the standard record label control.[3] The band promoted its own tours and music with the help of early file sharing services like Napster to reach thousands of fans. In this manner, they achieved stardom without the typical assistance of album singles played on major radio stations.

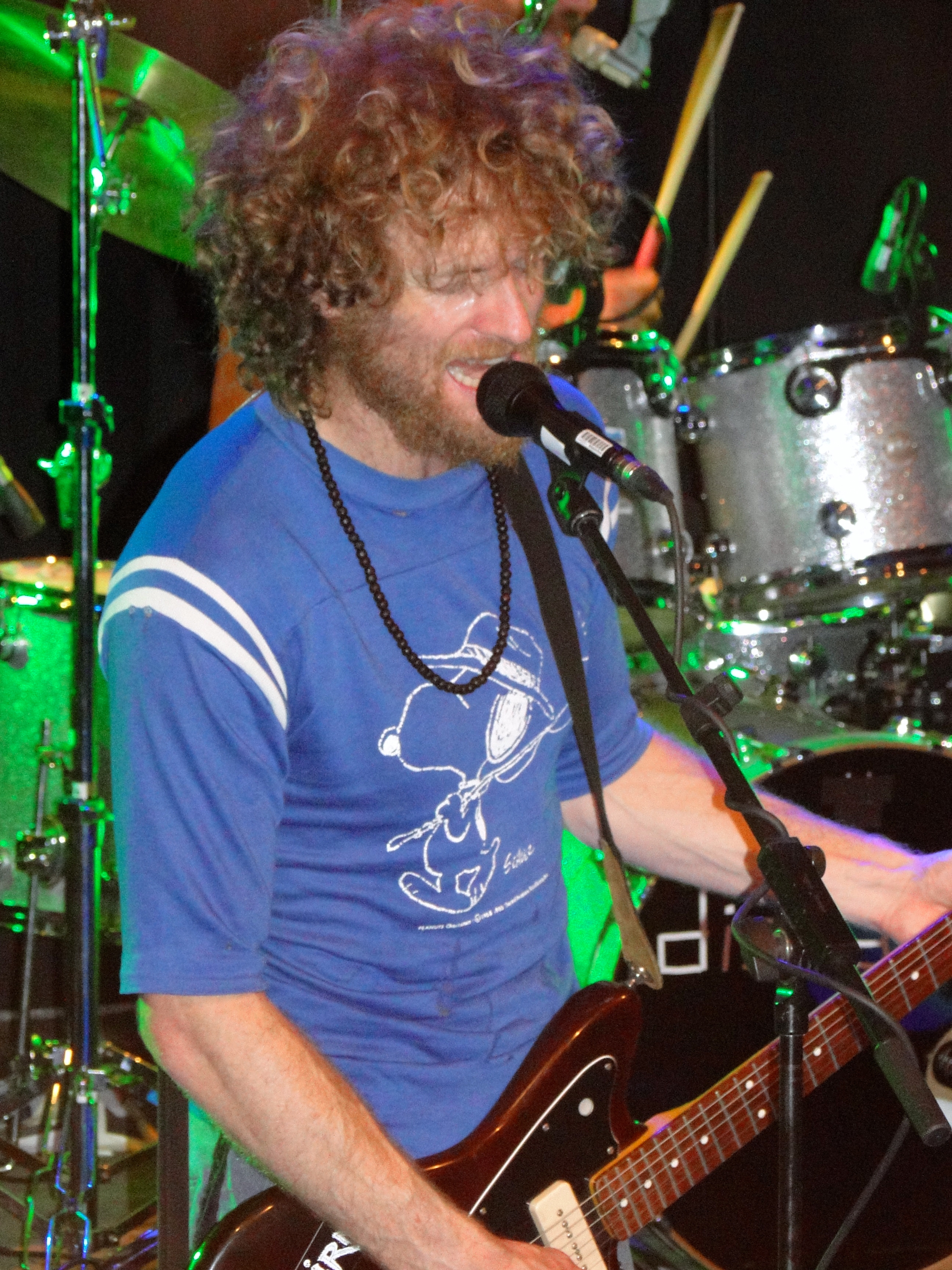
Chad Urmston with Dispatch in Germany, Hamburg, 2012

In 2004, Dispatch performed a final show at the Hatch Shell in Boston, before taking a long hiatus. Though the band, and the Boston Police Department, expected a crowd of about 20,000, the show attracted over 110,000 fans from all over the world. The Dispatch hiatus lasted almost a decade. It ended in the beginning of 2011, when the band announced a national tour.

With State Radio, Urmston focused exclusively on guitar and vocals rather than switching instruments as he did with Dispatch. Lyrically, State Radio songs are heavily influenced by politics and social issues as opposed to most Dispatch songs. State Radio originally, under their first name Flag of the Shiners, consisted of second guitarist Pete Halby, bassist Chuck Fay, and drummer Mike Greenfield. After their debut self-titled EP "Flag of the Shiners" was released by Fenway Recordings in late 2002, the band went on a temporary hiatus throughout 2003 as Urmston recovered from throat surgery.

Flag of the Shiners reformed as State Radio in 2004 and began to tour consecutively throughout the next decade with various band line ups. Their second EP "Simmer Kane" was released in March 2004. It was a vast departure in style from their concurrent live show and their first EP in featuring acoustic instead of heavy electric guitar, quieter more folk-like song writing and Urmston was assisted with vocals by Erin Lashnits Coughlin aka "Ras LC". The album closely resembled Urmston's later solo work rather than anything performed by State Radio or Dispatch at the time, and indeed was re-released under the solo moniker in August 2012. In late 2004, the group slimmed-down to a trio with new drummer Brian Sayers. Following the December 2005 release of State Radio's first full-length album, "Us Against the Crown," drummer Michael Najarian replaced Brian Sayers.

Between 2006 and 2012, State Radio released four studio albums, five EPs and three live EP albums. However, although the Live at the Sync EP and Live from the Brattle Theatre releases are made up predominantly of State Radio songs, they are Chad Stokes solo acoustic performance albums. For two of the band's final tours, in 2011 and 2012, they were joined by Matt Embree of the Rx Bandits on second guitar and backing vocals. In 2012 they recorded a covers EP with Embree vocal overdubs that remains unreleased.

In 2006, Urmston collaborated with Boston local punk band Plan b to record the track "Bandwagon" from their sophomore release Welcome! Generations.

In 2007, State Radio began the tradition of launching service projects in each city the band visited. Service projects have become a staple of Urmston's performances. He brought the tradition to Dispatch when the band reunited and encourages service projects and fundraisers in each city where he performs solo.

In December 2007, Urmston briefly reconvened with Dispatch for a sold out three-night charity performance at Madison Square Garden, with funds going toward Zimbabwe relief. The band reunited in 2011 and has since performed throughout the United States and Europe. They have since released two EPs and two LPs, as well as a double live album and a DVD.

In June 2011, Urmston released a solo album entitled "Simmerkane II" under the name Chadwick Stokes and launched a solo tour to promote it. In 2012, Urmston released "Simmerkane I," a collection of acoustic material and early recording including three songs named for his wife and tour manager, Sybil Gallagher. Three years later, after albums with State Radio and Dispatch each, Urmston released his second full-length solo-album, called "The Horse Comanche" in February 2015. Through a series of "Living Room" concerts, Urmston partially crowdsourced the album. Eight of the album's ten tracks were co-produced by Sam Beam, better known by his stage moniker Iron & Wine, and Beam's frequent collaborator Brian Deck. Urmston used the Iron & Wine band for the sessions. The remaining two tracks, "Our Lives Our Time" and "I Want You Like a Seatbelt," were produced by Noah Georgeson. In 2016, Urmston released "The Story of Bobby & Maeve", a collection of B-sides from The Horse Comanche.

In September 2013, it was announced on State Radio's website and on their Facebook page that Mike "Maddog" Najarian had left State Radio to pursue a career in finance. Chad wrote, "Above all, he drummed his ass off every night and it was an honor to share the stage with him and feel that mac truck energy coming from the kit."

In November 2019 Urmston released another solo album, titled "Chadwick Stokes and the Pintos."

== In the media ==
In 2010, State Radio won Best Social Action Song from the 9th Annual Independent Music Awards for "Calling All Crows"

== Activism ==
Urmston writes the majority of his songs about historical and contemporary social issues, and advocates social change in many of his songs.

Alongside his Dispatch band members, Urmston formed the nonprofit Elias Fund to sponsor community development and education in Zimbabwe, including scholarships in the name of both of Elias's children. After creating the Elias Fund, Urmston also formed the Dispatch Foundation, which helps to address social and economic problems in Zimbabwe and the Calling All Crows organization which works to empower women across the globe. He is also involved in the Amplifying Education organization, which helps provide schools in need of critical resources.

Urmston was honored as Humanitarian of the Year by the Boston Music Awards in 2008.

=== Elias Fund ===
The story behind the song "Elias" written by Urmston about his experience living and teaching in Zimbabwe inspired the nonprofit organization the Elias Fund to form in 2005. The Elias Fund looks to provide hope and opportunity to Zimbabwean youth through community development and education while empowering the American youth culture to embrace their global role and make it an active one.

=== Dispatch Foundation ===
In 2007, The Dispatch Foundation was created following the Dispatch Madison Square Garden Reunion benefit concerts. The organization works to address the deep-seated social and economic problems plaguing Zimbabwe such as inflation, starvation, unemployment and HIV/AIDS.

=== Calling All Crows ===
In 2008, State Radio started an activist group called Calling All Crows to "inspire public service" and "promote human rights." Currently, they are working with Oxfam America's Stoves for Sudan Project. Calling All Crows is hoping to raise money for 5,000 stoves for 5,000 different women in Sudan through fan activism before concerts.

=== Amplifying Education ===
The three members of Dispatch founded the non-profit, Amplifying Education, to encourage volunteers to take on simple actions to help improve schools and support education. The campaign works with the Calling All Crows non-profit to organize tour projects. It has worked with more than 600 fan volunteers working nearly 4,000 hours to improve schools in North America and Europe. The band has also collected more than 10,000 donated books for Better World Books and has raised more than $250,000 to support local organizations.

== Equipment ==
Guitars

- Creston Electric Instruments custom
- 1958 Gibson Les Paul Junior
- 1979 Fender Stratocaster
- Modulus G3CT (Customized for Urmston with a truck inlay)
- Township Special AfriCan Gas Can Guitar
- Guild D40AE Acoustic Guitar
- Gretsch G5135 Electromatic Corvette
- Modulus Genesis 3
- Fender Jazzmaster
- Bohemian Guitars Surf Wax gas can guitar
- Vintage Gibson Blue Ridge Acoustic
- 1970 Gibson B25

Amplifier

- Fender Hot Rod DeVille Amplifier

Effects

- MXR Micro Amp
- ProCo The Rat
- Fulltone Fat Boost
- Dunlop Crybaby GCB95
- Menatone The Blue Collar Overdrive
- Fulltone Supa-Trem
- Boss DD-5 Digital Delay
- Rapco AB100
- Boss TU-2 Chromatic Tuner

== Discography ==
See also Dispatch Discography

=== Chadwick Stokes ===
==== Studio albums ====
- 2011: Simmerkane II - Nettwerk Records
- 2012: Simmerkane I and the Fall River Sybils - Ruff Shod Records
- 2015: The Horse Comanche - Ruff Shod Records
- 2019: Chadwick Stokes & The Pintos - Ruff Shod Records

==== Live albums and EPs ====
- 2009: Live At the Brattle Theater
- 2011: "Live At the Armory"
- 2015: The Horse Comanche B Sides (The Story of Bobby and Maeve) EP

==== Singles ====
- 2011: "Back to the Races"
- 2015: "Home That Never Was"

==== Music videos ====
- 2011: "Rainsong"
- 2014: "Our Lives Our Time"

=== State Radio ===
==== Studio albums ====
- 2006: Us Against the Crown
- 2007: The Barn Sessions
- 2007: Year of the Crow
- 2009: Let It Go U.S. #96
- 2012: Rabbit Inn Rebellion

==== Live albums and EPs ====
- 2005: Live at the Sync
- 2009: State of Georgia EP
- 2011: Live At the Boston Pavilion

==== EPs ====
- 2002: Flag of the Shiners EP
- 2004: Simmer Kane EP
- 2005: Peace Between Nations EP
- 2007: Wicker Plane EP
- 2009: Calling All Crows EP

==== Singles ====
- 2007: "Gang of Thieves"
- 2008: "Knights of Bostonia"

==== Compilation appearances ====
- 2012: "John Brown" on Chimes of Freedom: Songs of Bob Dylan Honoring 50 Years of Amnesty International
