= 2008 Origins Award winners =

The following are the winners of the 35th annual (2008) Origins Award, presented at the 2009 Origins Game Fair

Category	Winner	Company	Designer(s)
Best Historical Miniature Figure or Line	SS-Panzerdivision ‘Das Reich’ Panzerkompanie (GEAB06) [15mm Line]	Battlefront Games	
Best Historical Miniature Game Rules Supplement	Rise of Rome (Fields of Glory Supplement)	Osprey Publishing	
Best Collectible Card Game Rules or Expansion	Magic the Gathering: Shards of Alara 1	Wizards of the Coast	
Best Historical Miniatures Rules - TIE	Field of Glory; Songs of Drums and Shakos	Osprey Publishing/Slitherine Software; Ganesha Games	Richard Bodley-Scott; Sergio Laliscia and Andrea Sfiligoi
Best Historical Board Game	Conflict of Heroes: Awakening the Bear!	Academy Games	Uwe Eickert
Best Game-Related Book Non-Fiction	Tour de Lovecraft: The Tale	Atomic Overmind Press	Ken Hite
Best Game-Related Book Fiction	Worlds of Dungeons & Dragons Volume 2	Devil’s Due	editors: James Lowder and Mike O’Sullivan
Best Game Accessory	D-Total	Gamescience	Dr. A. F. Simkin, Frank Dutrain and Louis Zocchi
Best Miniature Figure or Line	Star Wars Miniatures: The Clone Wars	Wizards of the Coast	Rob Watkins
Best Miniature Game Rules	Classic Battletech: Tactical Operations	Catalyst Game Labs	Randall N. Bills and Herbert A. Beas II
Best Role Playing Game Supplement	Serenity Adventures	Margaret Weis Productions	Alana Abbot, Billy Aguiar, James Davenport, Ted Reed and James M. Ward
Best Role Playing Game	Mouseguard	Archaia Studios Press	Luke Crane and David Petersen
Best Children’s, Family or Party Game	Say Anything	North Star Games	Dominic Craphuchettes and Satish Pillalamarri
Best Traditional Card Game	Dominion	Rio Grande Games	Donald X. Vaccarino
Best Board Game	Pandemic	Z-Man Games, Inc.	Matt Leacock
Best Play By Mail Game	Hyborian War	Reality Simulations Inc.	
Vanguard Award	Flames of War: Firestorm Campaign		
