= Almost Paradise =

Almost Paradise may refer to:

- Almost Paradise (TV series), a 2020–2023 American-Philippine crime drama
- "Almost Paradise" (Cold Case), a 2010 TV episode
- "Almost Paradise" (song), a 1984 song by Mike Reno and Ann Wilson from the Footloose film soundtrack
- "Almost Paradise", a 1957 song by the Norman Petty Trio
