= 2016 Origins Award winners =

The following are the winners of the 43rd annual (2016) Origins Award, presented at Origins 2017:

Category	Winner	Company	Designer(s)
Game of the Year	Scythe	Stonemaier Games	
Best Board Game	Scythe	Stonemaier Games	
Best Card Game	Mystic Vale	Alderac Entertainment Group	
Best Family Game	Happy Salmon	North Star Games	
Best Miniatures Game	Warhammer 40,000 Kill Team	Games Workshop	
Best Collectible Game	Pokémon XY - Steam Siege	The Pokémon Company	
Best Role-Playing Game	No Thank You, Evil!	Monte Cook Games	
Best Game Accessory	Blood Rage Organizer	The Broken Token	

== Fan Favorites ==
Category	Winner	Company	Designer(s)
Fan Favorite Board Game	Scythe	Stonemaier Games	
Fan Favorite Card Game	Mystic Vale	Alderac Entertainment Group	
Fan Favorite Family Game	Happy Salmon	North Star Games	
Fan Favorite Miniatures Game	Warhammer 40,000 Kill Team	Games Workshop	
Fan Favorite Collectible Game	Magic the Gathering: Kaladesh Booster	Wizards of the Coast	
Fan Favorite Role-Playing Game	Star Wars: Edge of the Empire	Fantasy Flight Games	
Fan Favorite Game Accessory	Blood Rage Organizer	The Broken Token	

== Hall of Fame inductees ==
Mike Elliott and Jennell Jaquays
