= Evolution (board game) =

2014 board game

- Evolution (third edition) box cover
- Years active: 2014–present
- Genres: Evolutionary conflict
- Players: 2–6
- Playing time: 60 min
- Chance: medium

Evolution is a 2014 board game where 2-6 players build a highly competitive ecosystem of omnivores, carnivores and scavengers. Players adapt their existing species and evolve new ones in response both to the abundance or scarcity of food, but also the behaviour of other species in the ecosystem. The scoring system rewards players whose species have high populations, consume the most food and are the most diverse. It was designed by Dominic Crapuchettes of North Star Games, working with Dmitry Knorre and Sergei Machin, who had previously released a similar game in Russia.

== Gameplay ==
Over the course of the game, each player will create, feed, adapt and sometimes lose a number of species. Each species consists of body size and population stats and up to 3 (or 2 in a two-player game) trait cards. A species can also hold food tokens and players also have a food bag or screen for storing any food their species ate over the course of the game. At the end of the game players get 1 point for each food token consumed, 1 point for each population point and 1 point for each trait card that is in use. The player with the most points wins.

The shared components include the deck of trait cards, the watering hole (which is a shared board that holds food tokens), the supply of food tokens and the species components. Finally there is a first player marker which passes in a clockwise direction each round.

The core component of the game is the cards, which are dealt at the beginning of each round according to how many species each player has. They can be used in a number of ways depending on the phase of the turn. There is a food selection phase, where each player secretly selects one card to add food to (or deduct from) the watering hole. There is a card playing phase, when cards can be used either to increase population or body size of one species; to enhance a species with a new trait or to create a new species. Cards may be withheld either to power the intelligence trait during the feeding phase or for subsequent rounds. During the feeding phase in turn each player selects one species to feed from the watering hole. However the efficiency of the feeding can be enhanced in various ways by the applied traits or a species may have the carnivore trait meaning it attacks other species to feed. In turn some traits are defences against predation and carnivores may have ways of overcoming those defences creating an evolutionary arms race.

At the end of the round, species that failed to feed their population, must reduce their population to the food eaten. If at any point a species loses all its population it goes extinct, and the player is compensated with cards equal in number to the trait cards possessed by the extinct species. The final round starts when the draw deck is empty. Any cards that the players were entitled to are instead drawn from cards set aside at the beginning of the game.

== History ==
In 2010, a Russian company, RightGames, released Evolution: The Origin of Species designed by Dmitry Knorre (a professional biologist) and Sergei Machin. This game is similar to Evolution, but there are differences. For example, the food in the watering hole is determined by dice. In 2013, Knorre and Machin released Evolution: Random Mutations as a sequel to The Origin of Species, which according to Stuart West "does a great job of illustrating the random role of mutation, which can increase or decrease fitness".

North Star Games acquired the English rights to Evolution: The Origin of Species and released the result in 2014 as Evolution. They changed some rules so that Dale Yu considered "the 2014 version a different game entirely from its predecessor". A second edition was released in 2015. Flight, added as an expansion in 2015, allows players to deploy more costly but flexible flying species. A Climate expansion was released in 2016. It is also available as a stand-alone game. Evolution: The Beginning, a stand-alone simplified version aimed at younger players, was initially released exclusively in Target stores in 2016, but was released more widely in 2018. A video game adaptation of Evolution was released in 2019.

In 2020, a stand-alone sequel, Oceans, was released that retains the basic core ideas, but also plays very differently. Apart from the aquatic theme, one notable innovation is the introduction of dramatic shifts such as the Cambrian explosion.

North Star Games have announced (via a product page at BoardGameGeek) a "complete redesign" of the system to "Make all Expansions Compatible" and "Make the base game a more gentle and inviting experience to new players". This is scheduled for release in 2023.

== Reception ==
The San Francisco Chronicle called Evolution one of the "best board games to play this year" for a "visceral sense of how cutthroat the law of the jungle can be". Stuart West reviewed Evolution for Nature (along with two other Evolution-themed games): "The gameplay is simple to grasp, but can get very tactical. In particular, as with real evolution, the best strategy depends on what everyone else is doing". The Guardian praised the game: "With 129 trait cards, there's a lot of variety – around 12,000 potential species to create – and you can split your play style between spawning peaceful plant-eaters or creating carnivores to feed on other players' beasts". Ars Technica praised the series' artwork, the handling of the theme, its "edutainment" value, its engine building and the enjoyability of its game play. They also called Evolution: Climate one of "the best board games of 2016".

Morgan Muell et al (writing in the scientific journal Evolution), praised Evolution: The Beginning for its educational value, saying "It is particularly well-suited for teaching evolutionary arms races, adaptations, and interspecific interactions. In particular, we think the game is excellent for demonstrating how evolution has no foresight — a difficult concept for many students". They also called Evolution: Climate their "top-rated evolution themed strategy board game for use as an educational resource" whilst retaining gameplay that "remains fairly simple to understand (and to teach)".
