= Peace Between Nations =

Peace Between Nations EP

Studio album by State Radio
- Released: 2005
- Recorded: ???
- Genre: Rock, indie rock, ska, reggae

State Radio chronology
| Simmer Kane EP (2004) | Peace Between Nations EP (2005) | Us Against the Crown (2006) |

Peace Between Nations EP is a 2005 album by reggae rock band, State Radio, headlined by former Dispatch vocalist, Chad Urmston. It features some of the more mellow acoustic work that characterized their last album, the Simmer Kane EP, along with some throwbacks to their original rock style of Flag of the Shiners, such as 'The Diner Song' and 'Democracy in Kind'. The EP was originally released as a four-song disc, without the Simmer Kane tracks ('Keepsake' and 'Heady Riser') or the live takes ('Man in the Hall' and 'Mr. Larkin'), and with the version of 'Calvado's Chopper' that later appeared on The Barn Sessions, then rereleased with the current track list.

== Version 2.0 track listing ==
1. First One Shot – 4:57
2. Democracy in Kind – 4:18
3. Keepsake – 3:53
4. The Diner Song – 3:05
5. Heady Riser – 5:17
6. Mr. Larkin – 3:35
7. Man in the Hall – 3:02

== Version 1.0 track listing ==
1. Democracy in Kind
2. The Diner Song
3. First One Shot
4. Calvado's Chopper
