= Norbert's Gambit =

Currency conversion technique

Norbert's gambit is a technique used primarily by Canadian investors to convert Canadian dollars (CAD) into U.S. dollars (USD), or vice versa, by trading dual-listed securities (or an ETF with CAD and USD units) and asking a broker to journal the position from one currency line to the other. The method reduces or avoids the retail foreign-exchange spread normally charged by brokers and banks.

== Origin ==
The strategy is named for Canadian investment adviser Norbert Schlenker. Early Canadian personal-finance coverage attributes the popularisation of the technique to Schlenker and explains its steps for do-it-yourself investors.

== Method ==
A typical CAD→USD conversion proceeds as follows:

1. Buy a Canadian-dollar listing of a dual-listed security or an ETF with both CAD and USD units (for example, the Global X/Horizons US Dollar Currency ETF, tickers DLR and DLR.U).
2. Ask the broker to journal (transfer) the position from the CAD line to the USD line after trade/settlement, so the holding becomes the USD-traded version.
3. Sell the USD-traded version to receive USD cash. The all-in cost is typically limited to commissions and bid–ask spreads, rather than a 1–3% retail FX spread.

Some Canadian brokers allow the journaling request online at no charge; processing and settlement timelines depend on the security (e.g., DLR/DLR.U on the Toronto Stock Exchange trade and settle on a T+1 basis).

== Instruments ==
Many investors use the Global X (formerly Horizons) US Dollar Currency ETF: DLR (CAD units) and DLR.U (USD units). The fund's objective is to reflect the value of the U.S. dollar, net of expenses, and it explicitly offers CAD and USD-traded units, which facilitates the gambit.

Dual-listed Canadian stocks (for example, interlisted on the TSX and NYSE) may also be used, though this can introduce equity-price risk during the process.

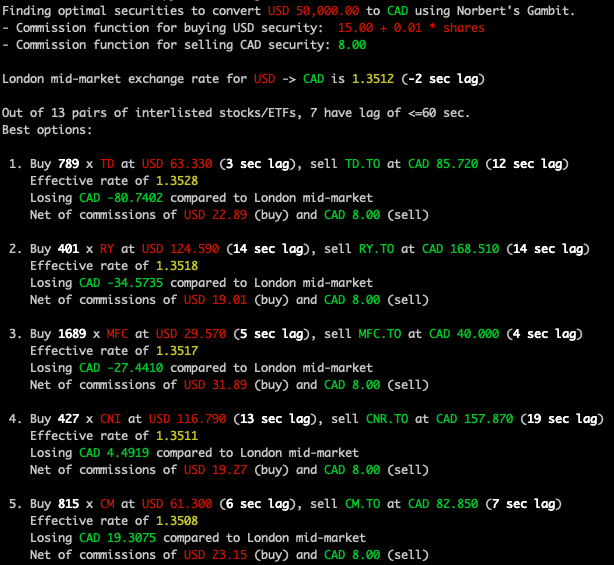
A screenshot of eNGame calculate the optimal dual-listed securities for use in Norbert's Gambit

Tools exist to automate the selection of the optimal dual-listed securities for Norbert's Gambit.

== Costs, benefits, and risks ==
Norbert's gambit can reduce conversion costs from typical retail FX spreads (~1–3%) to a small fraction of that amount, especially on larger sums. Risks and limitations include: timing risk while waiting for journaling/settlement; bid–ask spreads and commissions; and operational differences among brokers. When using interlisted stocks rather than a currency ETF, equity-price movement can affect the outcome.

== Tax considerations ==
In non-registered accounts, the gambit may create taxable gains or losses (for example, if an interlisted stock's price changes between the buy and sell). The technique itself does not avoid U.S. withholding tax on dividends—those rules depend on account type and security listing.

== See also ==
- Foreign exchange market
- Exchange-traded fund
- Dual listing
