= Jesper deClaville Christiansen =

Danish materials scientist

Jesper deClaville
- Born: 30 June 1963 (age 63); Skive, Denmark
- Education: Aalborg University and Brunel University
- Occupation: Materials scientist
- Awards: Order of the Dannebrog (Danish Knighthood, 2014)
- Scientific career
- Fields: Materials science
- Workplaces: Aalborg University

Jesper deClaville Christiansen (born 30 June 1963) is a Danish professor in Materials Science and Technology. Professor Christiansen is known for his work in the field of mechanics of polymers, diffusion, rheology and micro and nano composites especially.

Professor Jesper deClaville Christiansen was knighted on 11. April 2014 (ridder af Dannebrog) by Queen Margrethe II of Denmark.

Professor Christiansen received his PhD degree in 1989 after joint studies at Aalborg University, Denmark and Brunel University in London, U.K. His appointment to Professor in Materials Science came in 1998 where a 5-year research professorship in rheology of silicates initiated a chair in Materials Science.

Since 1 October 2012 Professor Christiansen has been coordinator of the European Community Research Program FP-7 Large EVOLUTION under the "Green Car" where a new electrical car 40% lighter than existing cars using green materials and technology is the aim. (12 mill. Euro). He was also coordinator for the successful European Community Research Program FP-7 Large Nanotough (2008–2011), where light and tough and strong nano composites were developed for space and automotive applications.

Professor Christiansen is active as reviewer for several journals: Langmuir, Journal of Polymer Science: Polymer Physics. Macromol. Mater. Eng., Oil & Gas Science and Technology-Revue de l'IFP, Composites A, Materials Science and Engineering, Geochimica Cosmochimica Acta, Journal of Engineering Education, Journal of Non-Newtonian Fluid Mechanics, American Mineralogist, Polymers and Polymer Composites, Journal of Rheology, Polymer Engineering and Science to mention some.

Professor Christiansen is Head of the Doctoral program in Mechanical and Manufacturing Engineering at Aalborg University

Professor Christiansen is author/co-author of more than 200 publications
