= Evolution: The Origin of Species =

Card game

- Designers: D. Knorre, S. Machin
- Publishers: Rightgames RBG SIA
- Players: 2 to 4
- Playing time: 30-60 minutes

Evolution: The Origin of Species is a card game created by Dmitriy Knorre and Sergey Machin in 2010. The game is inspired by evolutionary biology. It was published by SIA Rightgames RBG. English, French and German game editions were published in 2011. Two or more players create their own animals, make them evolve and hunt in order to survive.

In 2014, North Star Games published game Evolution. The original authors were part of the design crew.

== Rules ==
=== Place definition in match ===
The player with the largest number of victory points at the end of the game is the winner. The rankings of players in match are determined as follows:

1. number of victory points. Points are awarded to a player for all their surviving animals and their traits
2. number of cards in player's discard pile
3. throw of rolling dice

=== Preparation ===
The deck is shuffled. Then each player gets 6 cards from the top of the deck to their hands. They roll dice to determine the first player.

=== The game turn structure ===
Each turn of the game consists of four phases:

1. development phase
2. food bank determination phase
3. feeding phase
4. extinction and draw phase

During each phase, players act in order, moving clockwise. A player who can't or doesn't want to act can pass. Each phase ends when nobody can or wants to act.

=== Development phase ===
This phase consists of several rounds. During the phase, players can play their cards from their hands onto the table. A player may play a card as either a new animal or as a trait of an existing animal. If a card is played as a trait onto an animal, it goes under the animal card. Some cards have two traits, but only one trait can be used - the chosen one. No animal can have more than one of the same trait card, except for the "fat tissue" trait. Pairwise traits (i.e. "communication") are played only onto a pair of animals. Such cards are placed between the two cards onto which they are played. No pair of animals can have more than one of the same pairwise trait card. However, an animal can have several different pairwise traits with another animal.

=== Food bank determination phase ===
The amount of food available during this a is determined in this phase. The amount of food in the food bank is calculated this way:

- 2 players - number indicated by 1 die + 2
- 3 players - sum of 2 dice
- 4 players - sum of 2 dice + 2

Using two game sets or one game set with first expansion:

- 5 players - sum of 3 dice + 2
- 6 players - sum of 3 dice + 4

Using two game sets:

- 7 players - sum of 4 dice + 2
- 8 players - sum of 4 dice + 4

The first player rolls the dice. An amount of red tokens equal to the sum is put in the center of the table. This is the food bank for the current turn.

=== Feeding phase ===
The feeding phase consists of several rounds. During this phase, players take in turn one red food token from the food bank and put it on the top of one of their animals. A player can take more than one food token if an animal has certain traits i.e. "communication". Some traits allow the taking of blue "extra food" tokens i.e. "piracy", "cooperation".

An animal needs 1 food token to be fed without additional food requirements. Trait that increase food requirements have a number specifying the increase on the top left corner of the card.

An animal with the "carnivorous" trait can attack another animal of any player, including those of the attacker's owner. In this case, the player doesn't take a food token from the food bank. Instead, the "carnivorous" animal gets 2 blue food tokens if the attack was successful. As for the eaten animal, all traits, including pairwise traits, associated with it are put into the players' discard piles. A "carnivorous" animal can attack only once during a feeding phase. It cannot attack if it is already fed and doesn't have empty "fat tissue".

There are plenty of traits defending animals from carnivores. For example, "camouflage" defends animal from attack, as long as the attacker doesn't have "sharp vision". "Tail loss" allows an animal to survive an attack by discarding any trait of the defending animal. The carnivore only gets one blue food token as a result. By this methode defending animal can escagetmrid of tive traits such as "parasite".

The feeding phase ends when no players can or want to play traits, or when all animals are fed and have filled up their "fat tissue". Any remaining red tokens in the food bank are set aside.

=== Extinction and draw phase ===
At the beginning of this phase, all animals which are not fully fed are put into their players' discard piles, along with their traits, and all the pairwise traits associated with them. Each player has their own discard pile. The cards are put into a discard pile with the lizard face facing up. Players can look at cards in their own discard pile but not at ones in the piles of other players.

Then the first player deals new cards : one at a time in order, beginning from the first player. Each player gets in total the following number of cards: 1 + the number of survived animals belonging to the player. If a player doesn't have any animals or cards in their hand, then they take 6 cards from the deck during this phase. If the deck is empty, it's possible that one or more players get fewer cards then they are due.

After that, all food tokens except fat tokens are removed from the cards and set aside. The new turn starts with the development phase; the role of the first player passes clockwise from the first player of the previous turn.

=== The end of the game ===
After the deck is empty, the last turn begins. After the extinction phase of the previous turn, the victory points are counted. Each player is awarded victory points as follows:

- +2 points for each survived animal;
- +1 point for each trait of a survived animal
- +1 point for each increase in the food requirements for an animal.

=== Rule treatment ===
Since there is a variety of possible game cases, many arguable points can appear while treating the rules. Most of issues are solved after looking the rules more closely. Also there is official FAQ with answers the most popular questions. Several rules were changed or elaborated in the next editions and after expansions were published.

== Expansions ==
Evolution has several expansion packs.

=== Full Expansions ===
==== Evolution: Time to Fly ====
Evolution: Time to Fly - first official expansion published in 2011 in Russian language and then published in English, French, German, Italian, Polish, Czech, Slovak and Ukrainian languages. New traits were added.

==== Evolution: Contintents ====
Evolution: Continents - second official expansion published in 2012. New traits and rules were added: an animal now dwell in one of 3 different locations. Each location has its own unique food bank. Food bank depends on number of players.

==== Evolution. Plantarium ====
Evolution: Plantarium - third official expansion published in 2016. New entities, traits, and rules where added:

- Plants - new entity to generate food. Plants can grow: the number of red food left on a plant determines the number of plants in the next development phase. Thus an element of randomness is removed from food.
- Food bank determination phase is skipped in the game with Plantarium expansion.
- Plant traits. A player can put plant traits on a plant to make the plant suitable for player's animals or unsuitable for opponents' animals
- In setup the first player deals 8 cards to each player.
- Some traits from other expansions have changes in their rules in order to be appropriate with new features.

=== Mini Expansions ===
==== Evolution: Variation ====
Evolution: Variation Mini-Expansion published in 2012 as a part of gift set and republished stand-alone in 2015. It consists of 18 additional cards delivered in gift set. Gift set includes the basic set and expansions: Time To Fly, Continents. Also mini-expansion has additional cards for game Evolution: Random Mutations.

== Game scenarios ==
=== "Evolution. Fatality" scenario ===
In this scenario the game consists of a single turn. All cards from the deck is divided equally between players. Extraneous cards are removed from the game. Food bank determinations phase begins before development phase.

==== Preparation ====
They determine the first player randomly. Then the deck is shuffled up and all the cards are dealt to players equally.

Base deck of the game is suitable for this scenario. It can be expanded by cards from expansions. From Time to Fly expansion:

- "ambuch hunting"
- "intellect"
- "metamorphose"
- "flight"
- "anglerfish"
- "ink cloud"

From Continents expansion:

- "recombination"
- "aedificator"

In this case, the first player shuffles the deck and hand out 20 cards to each player. Then he removes the remaining cards from the game face down.

==== The game turn structure ====
1. food bank determination phase
2. development phase
3. feeding phase
4. extinction and draw phase

==== Food bank determination phase ====
Food bank is estimated this way:

- sum of 2 dice + number of players

==== Development phase ====
Players can't pass and must play all their cards.

==== Feeding phase ====
Players can't activate "hibernation ability"

==== Extinction phase ====
After this phase players count the victory and discard points as usual and determine the winner.

=== "Evolution. Equilibrium" scenario ===
In this scenario all the players have equal conditions. Players get the same set of traits and opportunity to choose required one in current game position. 1 "Evolution" base set is required for 2-4 players. 2 "Evolution" base sets - for 5-8 players.

==== Preparation ====
Each player get its own "genofond" of 21 cards (2 "swimming" cards and by 1 card of rest 19 traits). Then player choose 6 cart from his "genofond" to his hand. That is start hand for him. The rest cards are put as a ream with lizard face-up.

Base deck of the game is suitable for this scenario. It can be expanded by cards from expansions. From Time to Fly expansion:

- "shell"
- "trematode-cooperation"
- "anglerfish"
- "ink cloud"

==== The game turn structure ====
1. food bank determination phase
2. development phase
3. feeding phase
4. extinction and draw phase

==== Food bank determination phase ====
Food bank is estimated as in basic set rules.

==== Development phase ====
Each player has to play at least 1 card (as an animal or trait).

==== Feeding phase ====
This phase proceeds by basic set rules.

==== Extinction phase ====
At the end of extinction phase for each player it is determined, as in basic set rules, the quantity of cards to get (1 card per 1 survived animal + 1 card, if there is no survived animal and no cards in hand – player takes 6 cards). Player looks at his "genofond" and takes cards from it for the next turn. If there is no player who can take accrued cards in full, then the last turn begins.

== Awards ==
- 2014: Imagination Gaming Family & Education Awards 2014 Cross-Curriculim Bronze Award
- 2013: Nürnberg ToyAward nominee in Teenager&Family (11+ years) category
