= Evilution =

Evilution, a portmanteau of evil and evolution, may refer to:

== Music ==
=== Albums ===
- Evilution, by IllWill, featuring Andy LaRocque, 1999
- Evilution, by Lab 4, 2000
- Evilution: The Best of Evils Toy, by T.O.Y., 2002

=== Songs ===
- "Evilution", by Datsik from Vitamin D, 2012
- "Evilution", by Dio from Strange Highways, 1993
- "Evilution", by Dream Evil from United, 2006
- "Evilution", by Running Wild from Death or Glory, 1989

== Other uses ==
- Evilution (film), a horror film of 2009
- TNT: Evilution, an episode of the video game Final Doom

== See also ==
- Evolution (disambiguation)
