= Jeff Moonie Jr. =

American filmmaker/rapper

Jeff Moonie Jr. is an American filmmaker/rapper. He directed the feature-length documentary Donor, which was the recipient of the 2005 Best documentary award at the Asheville Film Festival. He also wrote all of the original songs and lyrics for CBS's Cold Case (season 7) episode 7 entitled "Read Between The Lines." Jeff Moonie Jr. made series history when his original composition of "Read Between The Lines" became the first original song in series history, to play over the case solving montage at the episode's conclusion. Jeff Moonie Jr. records music and performs .
