= Oceans (board game) =

2020 nature-themed strategy board game

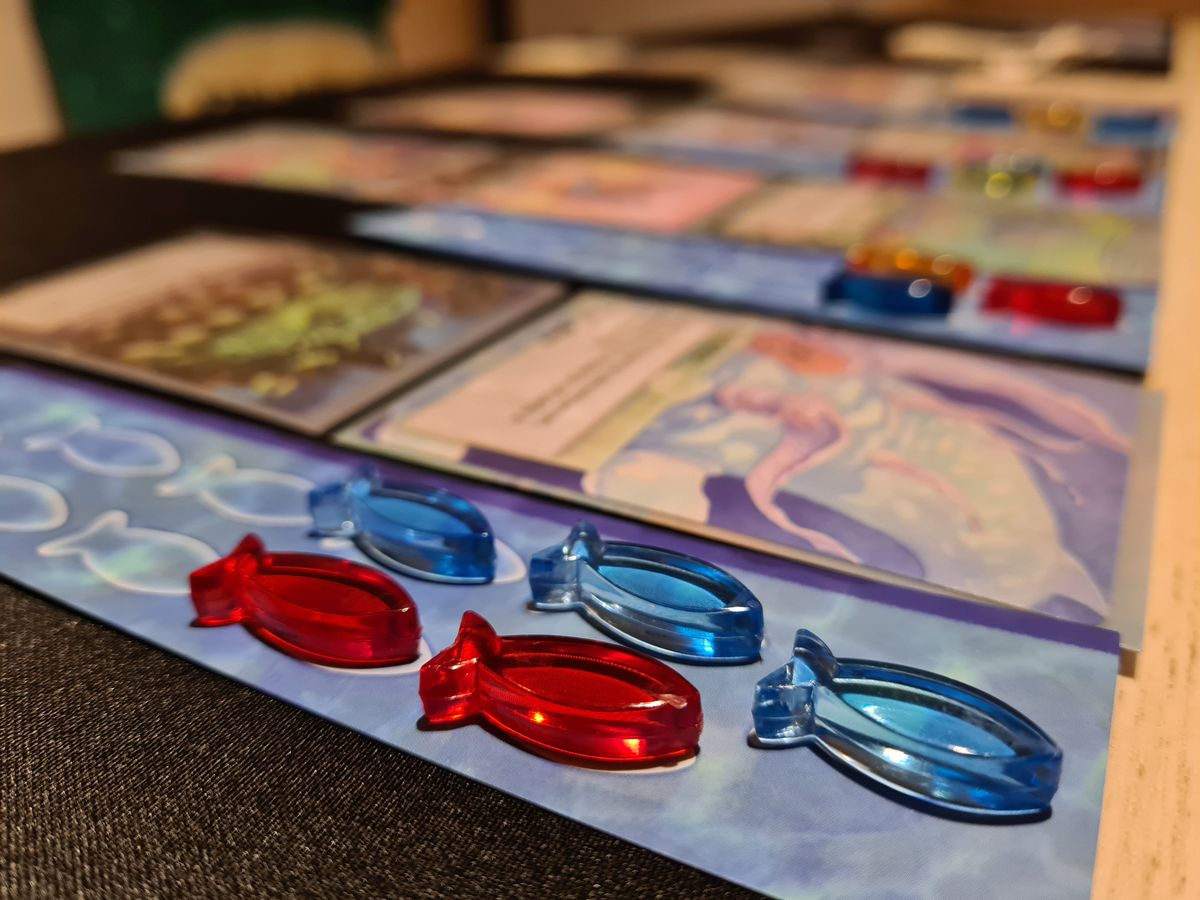
- Fish on species board, with adjacent trait cards
- Designers: Dominic Crapuchettes
- Illustrators: Catherine Hamilton
- Publishers: North Star Games
- Publication: 2020; 5 years ago
- Players: 2–4
- Playing time: 60–90 minutes
- Age range: 12+
- Website: www.northstargames.com/products/oceans

Oceans is a nature-themed strategy board game published in 2020 by North Star Games. It is a game in the Evolution series.

The game's development was funded via a crowdfunding campaign on Kickstarter.

== Gameplay ==
Unlike its predecessor Evolution, in which players execute their turns in shared phases, in Oceans players take individual turns to create species by assembling trait cards. These creatures are released into an aquatic ecosystem where they must obtain food and avoid becoming prey to other creatures. These are represented by boards that can hold nine fish (each fish is a "population token"). During the game, the creature may evolve defenses against predators, and predators may evolve tactics to circumvent those defenses. Up to three trait cards can be used to evolve a species. The ecosystems are represented by one reef board and an ocean board with three zones filled with fish tokens.

Each turn, the player uses one card to either evolve an extant species, to create a new one, or to migrate fish from one ocean box to another. They then feed one of their species, either by "grazing from the reef" ("foraging"), preying on another species ("attacking") or passively from the ocean ("gaining"). Finally, each species controlled by the player is aged, with one fish token removed from its board and added to the players score pile. The player then draws cards to fill a complement of four for their hand. If a species does not have sufficient fish on its board, it becomes extinct. If it exceeds the nine fish limit, it has overpopulated the ocean and half the fish tokens are removed from its board.

When the first ocean zone is emptied of fish, it results in a Cambrian Explosion. During this stage of the game, on each turn each player uses two trait cards, ages species twice, and can play cards from a 'The Deep' deck of 89 unique cards. The latter have a cost that must be paid in fish tokens from the player's score pile. The 'Reef' variant of the game dispenses with "The Deep" deck and uses two scenario cards instead.

The end of the game is reached once all ocean zones are depopulated of fish. The player with the most collective fish tokens in their score pile and on their species boards wins the game.

== Design ==
The company consulted with Brian O'Neill, a marine biologist at the University of Wisconsin–Whitewater, to establish the scientific background for the game.

Illustrations for the reef and surface cards were created by Catherine Hamilton, and the box art was designed by Hamilton and Guillaume Ducos. Cards in "The Deep" were illustrated by various artists.

== Reception ==
In a review for Science News, Mike Denison states that the game's design "masterfully translates the wonders and complexities of marine ecology to a tabletop setting" and the gameplay results in a "(mostly) scientifically accurate experience". However, it is possible to create a species with biologically conflicting traits, such as having both a parasitic and symbiotic relationship with another species.

In a review for Board Game Quest, Tony Mastrangeli described the pace of play as a "slow build up", and slower than its predecessor Evolution. Once the Cambrian Explosion phase is reached, the pace is much faster. The Reef variant is stated to be "excellent as a family game".
