= Us Against the Crown =

Studio album by State Radio
- Released: February 7, 2006
- Genre: Indie rock, rock, ska, reggae
- Length: 53:21
- Label: Nettwerk
- Producer: Mike Daly, Brian Humphrey, Paul Q. Kolderie, Craig Welsh

State Radio chronology
Peace Between Nations EP (2005)	Us Against the Crown (2006)	The Barn Sessions (2007)

Professional ratings
Review scores
Source	Rating
AllMusic	3/5 stars
Big Yawn	6/10
Punktastic	4/5 stars
Stylus Magazine	C+

Us Against the Crown is the first full-length studio album from reggae rock band State Radio, headlined by former Dispatch vocalist, Chad Urmston.

== Track listing ==
1. "People to People" – 4:16
2. "Mr. Larkin" – 4:07
3. "Camilo" – 4:48
4. "Right Me Up" – 4:11
5. "Black Cab Motorcade" – 4:02
6. "Riddle in Londontown" – 4:48
7. "Man in the Hall" – 3:47
8. "Waitress" – 3:55
9. "Diner Song" – 3:27
10. "Gunship Politico" – 5:41
11. "Rushian" – 2:53
12. "Calvado's Chopper" – 7:22
13. "Sybil I" – 2:55
- Hidden Track:
1. Indian Moon
