= Investec =

International specialist banking and asset management group

Investec Investec Limited & Investec plc

- The Investec building in Cape Town CBD
- Type: Dual-listed public company
- Traded as: JSE: INL; LSE: INVP; FTSE 100 component
- ISIN: ZAE000081949; GB00B17BBQ50
- Industry: Financial services
- Founded: Johannesburg, Gauteng, South Africa; 1974; 52 years ago
- Headquarters: Sandton, South Africa; London, United Kingdom
- Area served: South Africa; United Kingdom; Switzerland; Channel Islands; UAE
- Key people: Philip Hourquebie, Chairman; Fani Titi, CEO
- Products: Private Banking; Capital Markets; Investment Banking; Corporate, Business and Institutional Banking; Property Activities; Wealth Management; Investment Management
- Revenue: ▲£2,250.9 million (2026)
- Operating income: ▲£901.8 million (2026)
- Net income: ▲£725.4 million (2026)
- Total assets: ▲£63,833.6 million (2026)
- Total equity: ▲£6,070.7 million (2026)
- Number of employees: 7,400 (2026)
- Subsidiaries: Investec plc (on LSE): List: Investec Asset Management Ltd Investec Bank plc Investec Wealth & Investment Ltd Investec Holdings (Australia) Ltd Investec Asset Finance plc Investec Bank (Channel Islands) Ltd Investec Bank (Switzerland) AG Investec Irish Branch; Investec Limited (on JSE): List: Investec Bank Ltd Investec Bank (Mauritius) Ltd Investec Securities (Pty) Ltd Investec Asset Management Holdings (Pty) Ltd Investec Property Group Holdings (Pty) Ltd
- Website: investec.com

Investec is an Anglo-South African international banking and wealth management group, founded in Johannesburg, South Africa. It provides a range of financial products and services to a client base in Europe, Southern Africa, and Asia-Pacific.

Investec is dual-listed on the London Stock Exchange and the Johannesburg Stock Exchange. It is a constituent of the FTSE 100 index.

They are the current primary sponsors of the European Rugby Champions Cup.

== History ==
Investec was founded as a small leasing and financing company in 1974 in Johannesburg, South Africa, by Larry Nestadt, Errol Grolman and Ian Kantor. It has expanded through growth and acquisitions. It secured a banking licence in 1980 and was first listed on the JSE Securities Exchange in South Africa in 1986, after merging with Metboard, a trust company. In 1988, Investec Bank Limited was restructured into Investec Group Limited ("IGL"), giving Investec Management and staff control of the company.

In 1990, Investec acquired property management company I. Kuper & Company (Pty) Limited, Corporate Merchant Bank Limited (formerly Hill Samuel Merchant Bank Limited) and trade finance company Reichmans Limited. Investec entered the UK market in 1992, by acquiring London-based Allied Trust Bank Limited ('ATB'), its first international acquisition.

In 1998, Investec acquired Guinness Mahon, a leading London based merchant bank, and Henderson Crosthwaite, its stockbroking arm, for £95 million. It also bought Hambros plc, another London-based merchant bank the same year. It was first listed on the London Stock Exchange in 2002. In 2003, in a Black Economic Empowerment transaction empowerment partners acquired a 21.5% stake in the South Africa-listed Investec.

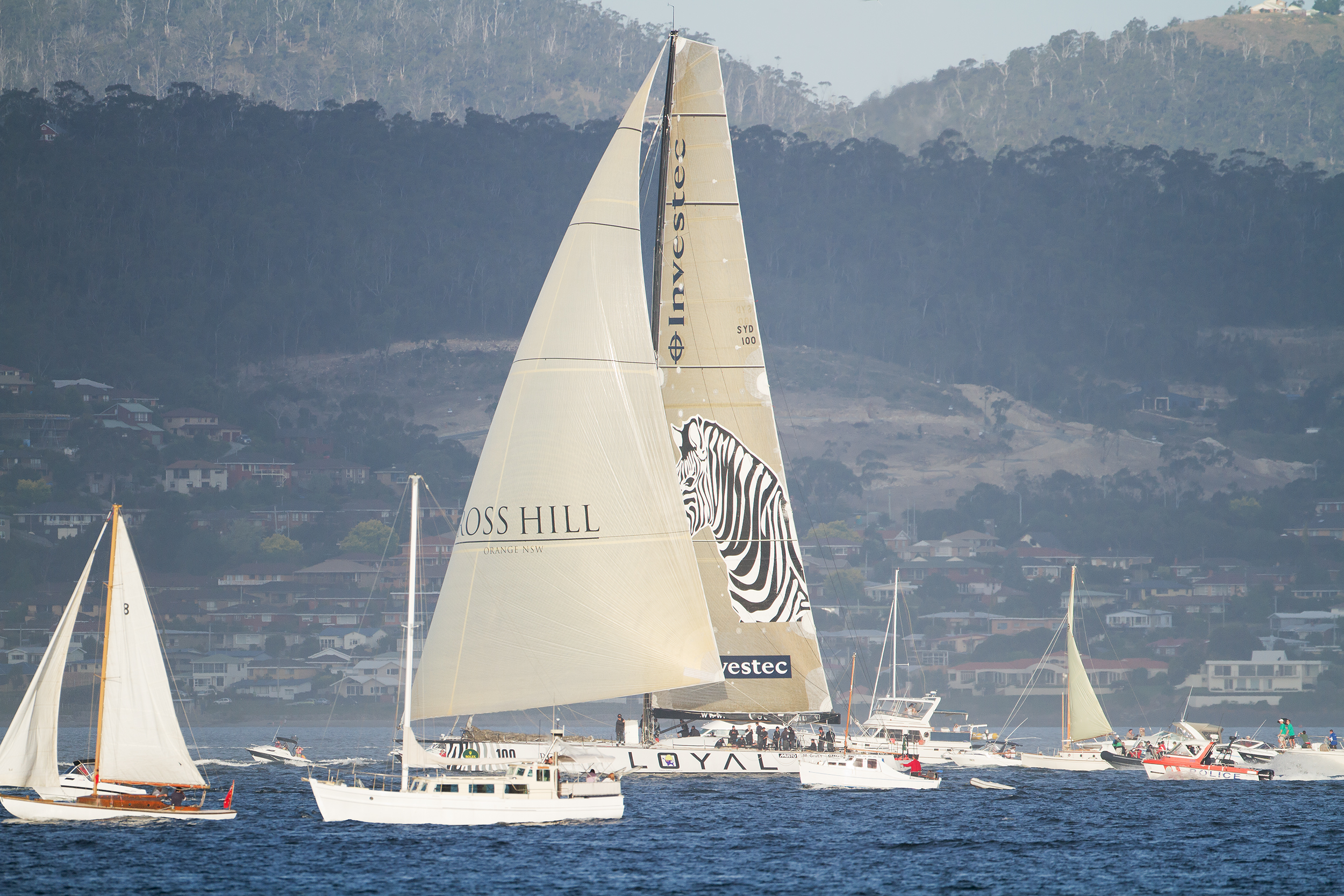
Investec Loyal, moments before winning the 2011 Sydney to Hobart Yacht Race

In 2005, Investec sold its UK private client stockbroking operation, Carr Sheppards Crosthwaite Limited to Rensburg plc. Investec retained a 47.7% interest in the combined entity, Rensburg Sheppards plc. In 2007, Investec plc acquired Kensington Group plc and Experien (Pty) Ltd.

Investec plc acquired the remaining shares in Rensburg Sheppards plc in 2010. This business has since been rebranded as Investec Wealth & Investment and incorporates other wealth activities previously operated through the bank. In 2011, Investec acquired London-based broker and asset manager Evolution Group for £230m after a bidding war with Canaccord Genuity.

In June 2012, Investec plc completed the €32 million acquisition of Irish brokerage firm, NCB. As a result, Investec now employs more than 240 specialists in Ireland.

In December 2017, Investec acquired Amicus Commercial Finance and rebranded it as Investec Capital Solutions.

In September 2018, following a strategic review, the Boards of Investec plc and Investec Limited announced that Investec Asset Management would become a separately listed entity. In March 2020, the Asset Management business was demerged and listed as Ninety One plc. The new name is in recognition of the brand's heritage – it was in 1991 that the investment firm was started in South Africa.

In April 2023, UK wealth manager Rathbones agreed to buy Investec's wealth and investment businesses in the UK and Channel Islands for £839 million. Under the deal terms, Investec Group owns 41% of Rathbones. The deal excluded Investec Bank (Switzerland) and Investec International wealth business.

In September 2025, Investec announced that it had become one of the first major banks in South Africa to enter the electricity market, after the National Energy Regulator of South Africa (Nersa) granted it a trading license. The license allows Investec to source its own power from renewable projects, as well as trade electricity over Eskom’s transmission and distribution networks.

== Operations ==
Investec employs approximately 8,200 people worldwide and operates primarily in South Africa and the United Kingdom. It also has banking operations in Ireland, Switzerland, Mauritius, Guernsey, India, Jersey, and the United States.

== Products and divisional structure ==
Investec consists of two areas of activity, namely: wealth, and investment and banking. Its specialist banking divisions include private banking, for high net worth and high income individuals, and corporate and investment banking, providing lending, transactional banking, treasury and trading, advisory and investment services.

== Legal structure ==
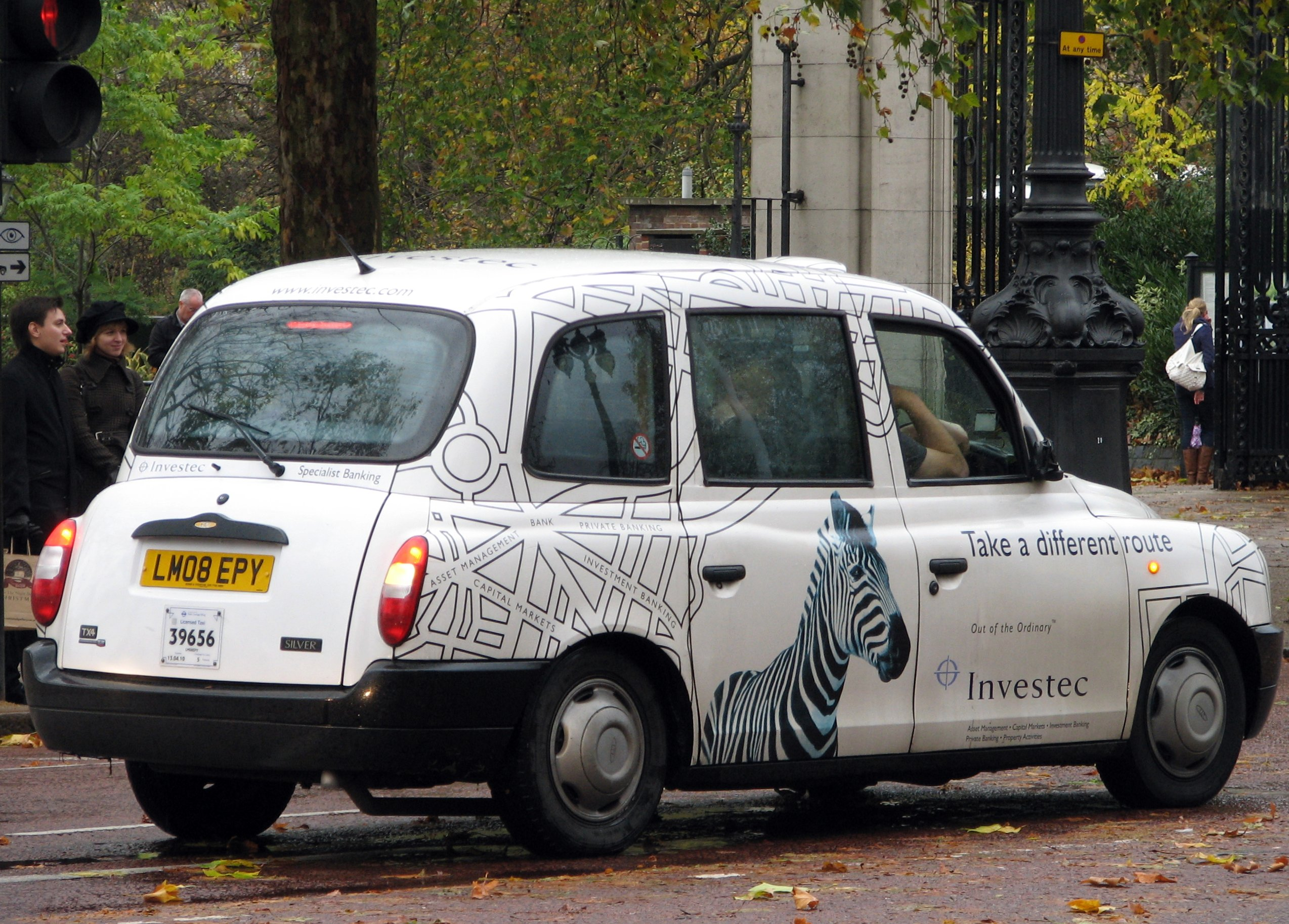
Investec advertising on a London TX4 taxi

In July 2002, Investec became the first South African company to list on both the London and Johannesburg stock exchanges, by implementing a dual listed companies (DLC) structure.

The main features of the DLC structure are:

- Investec plc and Investec Limited are separate legal entities and listings, but are bound together by contractual agreements and mechanisms.
- Investec plc is the holding company for the majority of the group's non-Southern African operations and Investec Limited is the holding company for the majority of the group's Southern African operations.
- Investec operates as a single unified economic enterprise.
- Shareholders have common economic and voting interests as if Investec plc and Investec Limited were a single company.
- Creditors, however, are ring-fenced to either Investec plc or Investec Limited as there are no cross guarantees between the companies.

== Empowerment in South Africa ==
Investec's approach to transformation within South Africa involves:

- Fostering the creation of new black entrepreneurial platforms
- Serving as a source of empowerment financing
- Encouraging internal transformation by bringing about greater representativity in the workplace. Investec focuses on creating black entrepreneurs within its organisation

== Accolades ==
In July 2025, Investec was named the best-performing bank in the United Kingdom, and second-best performing bank in South Africa, by financial affairs publication The Banker. The ranking is determined by performance indicators including asset quality, growth, profitability, and operational efficiency.

== Sponsorships ==
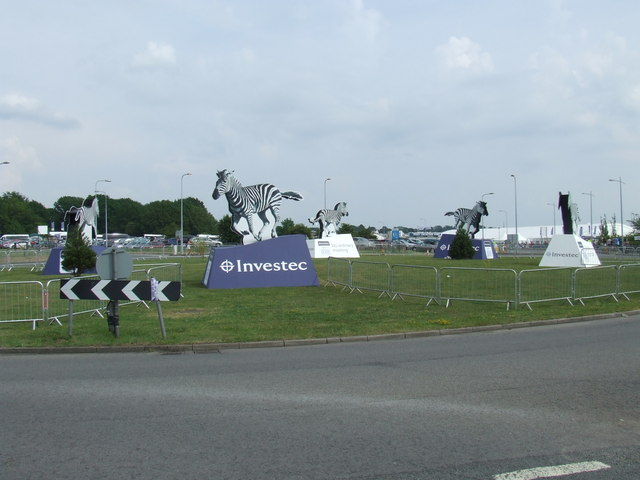
Investec at the Epsom Derby, 2010

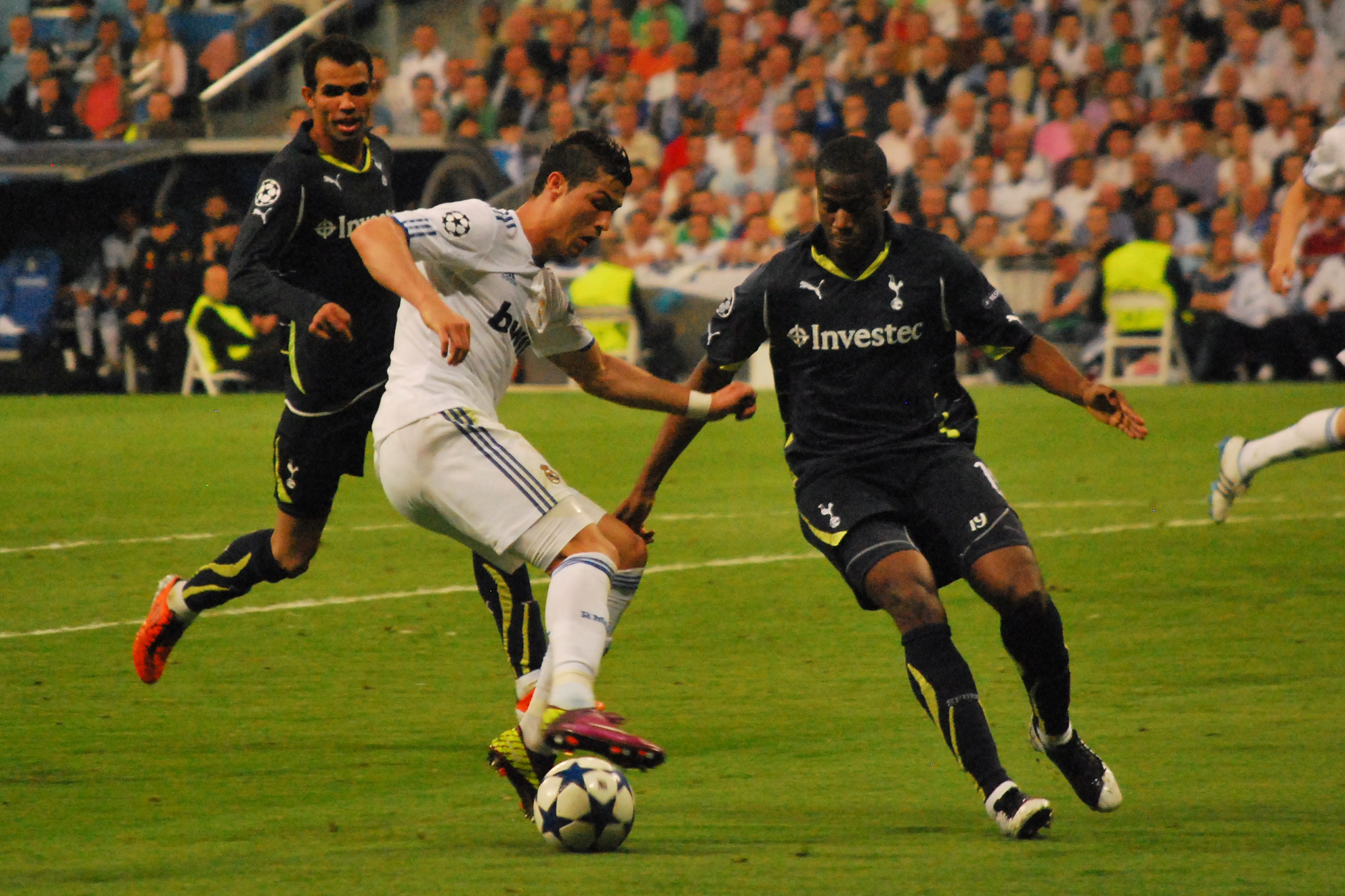
Investec as Tottenham's Champions League shirt sponsor in 2011

=== Cricket ===
Investec announced a ten-year title sponsorship of Investec Test Match cricket for the England and Wales Cricket Board on 24 November 2011 at Lord's Cricket Ground. The deal covered all home test series and ran for six years until the summer of 2017, when the company exercised a break clause in its contract with the ECB.

=== Field Hockey ===
Investec became the principal sponsor of the England and Great Britain Women's Hockey teams in July 2011, from grassroots to international level, for an undisclosed sum. The agreement was initially for a term of five years, and in March 2016 the deal was extended for an additional four years but was not renewed when the contract came to an end in August 2020.

=== Rugby ===
Investec has been involved in a number of rugby sponsorships around the world, stating that "rugby embodies Investec's beliefs in collaborative teamwork, innovative play and determination and it’s for these reasons that we support many rugby initiatives". From 2000 to 2011 Investec sponsored England Rugby Union home autumn internationals. The 35 games throughout the 12-year period were known as the Investec International Series (formerly the Investec Challenge) and were played at Twickenham Stadium, England.

In 2010 Investec became the official sponsors of the Tri Nations rugby competition in New Zealand, now known as The Rugby Championship. In 2016 the deal was extended through to 2020, and in 2019 the competition was known as The Investec Rugby Championship in New Zealand. Investec has sponsored the Super Rugby competition since 2011, when it acquired naming rights in New Zealand. Investec also supports the International Rugby Academy South Africa which aims to capitalise on an untapped demand for high performance in playing and coaching rugby in South Africa.

In August 2023, they became the primary sponsors of the European Rugby Champions Cup ahead of the 2023–24 Champions Cup season signing a deal lasting until 2028.

=== Horse Racing ===
Investec became a long-term sponsor of The Derby festival in the UK in 2009. The deal was extended to run until 2026 but the Jockey Club agreed to terminate the sponsorship in 2020 after the delayed running of the 241st Derby Festival on 4 July 2020. The two-day race meet became known as the Investec Derby Festival, incorporating two of the five British Classic Races, The Oaks and The Derby, the latter of which is also commonly known as the Greatest Flat race in the World. Investec has also sponsored the Investec Cape Derby in South Africa since 2009.

=== Association Football ===
Investec became the official shirt sponsor for Tottenham Hotspur's domestic cup games and UEFA Champions League games for the 2010-11 season and UEFA Europa League games for the 2011-12 season. In 2014, Investec became the official shirt sponsor for Widnes F.C. in the North West Counties Football League Division One.

=== Other sponsorships ===
Since 2005 Investec has been sponsoring a flagship project started by the Kutlwanong Centre for Math, Science and Technology. The project aims at improving the mathematics and science skills of students from historically disadvantaged regions across South Africa. The project has been a huge success year on year, with most of the students obtaining distinctions in mathematics and science, and their other subjects. In 2014 the project was awarded the Mail & Guardian Investing In The Future STEM award.

As of March 2019 Investec also helps to fund, along with several other large corporate sponsors, a private software engineering college called Wethinkcode, with campuses in both Johannesburg and Cape Town, with the objective of confronting the youth unemployment crisis in South Africa by providing free tuition for eligible students.

Other sponsorships included the Nelson Mandela 90th Birthday Tribute in London's Hyde Park.
