= Dual-listed company =

Corporate structure type

A dual-listed company (DLC) is a corporate structure in which two corporations function as a single operating business through a legal equalization agreement, but retain separate legal identities and stock exchange listings. Virtually all DLCs are cross-border, and have tax and other advantages for the corporations and their stockholders.

In a conventional merger or acquisition, the merging companies become a single legal entity, with one business buying the outstanding shares of the other. However, when a DLC is created, the two companies continue to exist, and to have separate bodies of shareholders, but they agree to share all the risks and rewards of the ownership of all their operating businesses in a fixed proportion, laid out in a contract called an "equalization agreement". The equalization agreements are set up to ensure equal treatment of both companies’ shareholders in voting and cash flow rights. The contracts cover issues that determine the distribution of these legal and economic rights between the twin parents, including issues related to dividends, liquidation, and corporate governance. Usually, the two companies will share a single board of directors and have an integrated management structure. A DLC is somewhat like a joint venture, but the two parties share everything they own, not just a single project; in that sense, a DLC is similar to a general partnership between publicly held corporations. This differs to a cross-listed company, which is (the same company) listed on multiple share markets. Samsung is an example of a cross-listed company (listed both on the Korean and the US stock market).

== Examples ==
Some major dual-listed companies include:

- ABB (Sweden/Switzerland 1988) — ABB AB (Stockholm Stock Exchange), ABB AG (Zurich Stock Exchange)
- Rio Tinto (Australia/UK 1995) — Rio Tinto Limited (ASX), Rio Tinto plc (LSE)
- AstraZeneca (UK/Sweden 1999) — AstraZeneca plc (LSE), AstraZeneca AB (Stockholm Stock Exchange)
- Perfetti Van Melle (Italy/Netherlands 2001) — Perfetti Van Melle S.p.A. (BIT), Perfetti Van Melle N.V. (Euronext Amsterdam)
- Investec (South Africa/UK 2002) — Investec plc (LSE), Investec Limited (JSE)
- Ninety One (South Africa/UK 2020) — Ninety One plc (LSE), Ninety One Limited (JSE)
- TelevisaUnivision (Mexico/US 2022) — Televisa, S. de R.L. de C.V., TelevisaUnivision Inc.

Other companies that were previously dual-listed include:

- Allied Zurich (now Zurich Insurance Group) (UK/Switzerland 1998-2000)
- BHP (Australia/UK 2001–2022) — BHP Group Limited (Australian Securities Exchange, ASX), BHP Group plc (LSE)
- Brambles (Australia/UK 2001-2006)
- Carnival Corporation (Panama/UK 2003-2026) — Carnival Corporation (NYSE), Carnival plc (LSE)
- Dexia (Belgium/France 1996-2000)
- Eurotunnel (France/UK 1986-2005)
- Fortis (Belgium/Netherlands 1990-2001)
- Mondi Group (South Africa/UK 2007-2019) — Mondi Limited (JSE), Mondi plc (LSE)
- Nordbanken/Merita (Sweden/Finland 1997-2000)
- Royal Dutch Shell (now Shell) (UK/Netherlands 1907-2022) — Royal Dutch Shell plc (LSE), Royal Dutch Shell N.V. (Euronext Amsterdam)
- SmithKline Beecham (UK/US 1989-1996)
- Reckitt Benckiser (now Reckitt) (UK/Netherlands 1999-2021) — Reckitt Benckiser plc (LSE), Reckitt Benckiser N.V. (Euronext Amsterdam)
- Thomson Reuters (UK/Canada 2008-2009)
- Reed Elsevier (now RELX) (UK/Netherlands 1993-2018) — Reed Elsevier plc (LSE), Reed Elsevier N.V. (Euronext Amsterdam)
- Unilever (UK/Netherlands 1930-2020) — Unilever plc (LSE), Unilever N.V. (Euronext Amsterdam)

== Motivations for adopting a DLC structure ==
A dual-listed company structure is effectively a merger between two companies, in which they agree to combine their operations and cash flows, and make similar dividend payments to shareholders in both companies, while retaining separate shareholder registries and identities. In virtually all cases, the two companies are listed in different countries.

There are often tax reasons for companies from different jurisdictions to adopt a DLC structure instead of a regular merger where a single share is created. A capital gains tax could be owed if an outright merger took place, but no such tax consequence would arise with a DLC deal. Differences in tax regimes may also favour a DLC structure, because cross-border dividend payments are minimized. In addition, there may be favourable tax consequences for the companies themselves. Once companies have chosen a DLC structure, there can be major tax obstacles to cancelling the arrangement.

Issues of national pride may sometimes also be involved; where both parties to a proposed merger or takeover are in a strong position and do not need to merge or accept a takeover, it can be easier to push it through if the country with the smaller business is not "losing" its corporation.

A third motive is the reduction of investor flow-back, which would depress the price of the stock of one of the firms in their own market if the merger route were used instead. That is, some institutional investors cannot own the shares of firms domiciled outside the home country or can only own such shares in limited quantity. In addition, in a merger, the non-surviving firm would be removed from all the indices. Index tracking funds would then have to sell the shares of the surviving company. With the DLC structure, all of this would be avoided.

A fourth motive is that DLCs do not necessarily require regulatory (anti-trust) consent and may not be constrained by the requirement of foreign investment approval. Finally, the access to local capital markets may be reduced when a quotation disappears in a regular merger. This is based on the idea that local investors are already familiar with the company from the pre-DLC period. However, the DLC structure also has disadvantages. The structure may hamper transparency for investors and reduce managerial efficiency. In addition, issuing shares in a merger and capital market transactions (such as SEOs, share repurchases, and stock splits) are more complex under the DLC structure.

== Mispricing in DLCs ==
The shares of the DLC parents represent claims on exactly the same underlying cash flows. In integrated and efficient financial markets, stock prices of the DLC parents should therefore move in lockstep. In practice, however, large differences from theoretical price parity can arise. For example, in the early 1980s Royal Dutch NV was trading at a discount of approximately 30% relative to Shell Transport and Trading PLC. In the academic finance literature, Rosenthal and Young (1990) and Froot and Dabora (1999) show that significant mispricing in three DLCs (Royal Dutch Shell, Unilever, and Smithkline Beecham) has existed over a long period of time. Both studies conclude that fundamental factors (such as currency risk, governance structures, legal contracts, liquidity, and taxation) are not sufficient to explain the magnitude of the price deviations. Froot and Dabora (1999) show that the relative prices of the twin stocks are correlated with the stock indices of the markets on which each of the twins has its main listing. For example, if the FTSE 100 rises relative to the AEX index (the Dutch stock market index) the stock price of Reed International PLC generally tends to rise relative to the stock price of Elsevier NV. De Jong, Rosenthal, and van Dijk (2008) report similar effects for nine other DLCs. A potential explanation is that local investor expectations affect the relative prices of the shares of the DLC parent companies.

Because of the absence of "fundamental reasons" for the mispricing, DLCs have become known as a textbook example of arbitrage opportunities, see for example Brealey, Myers, and Allen (2006, chapter 13).

== Arbitrage in DLCs ==
Price differences between the two markets in which dual-listed companies are listed (also called mispricing) has led to a number of financial institutions trying to exploit the mispricing by setting up arbitrage positions in such circumstances. These arbitrage strategies involve a long position in the relatively underpriced part of the DLC and a short position in the relatively overpriced part. For example, in the early 1980s an arbitrageur might have built up a long position in Royal Dutch NV and a short position in Shell Transport and Trading plc. This position would have yielded profits when the relative prices of Royal Dutch and Shell converged to theoretical parity. An internal document of Merrill Lynch investigates arbitrage opportunities in six DLCs. Lowenstein (2000) describes arbitrage positions of the hedge-fund Long-Term Capital Management (LTCM) in Royal Dutch/Shell. LTCM established an arbitrage position in this DLC in the summer of 1997, when Royal Dutch traded at an eight to ten percent premium. In total $2.3 billion was invested, half long in Shell and the other half short in Royal Dutch. In the autumn of 1998 large defaults on Russian debt created significant losses for the hedge fund and LTCM had to unwind several positions. Lowenstein reports that the premium of Royal Dutch had increased to about 22 percent and LTCM had to close the position and incur a loss. According to Lowenstein, LTCM lost $286 million in equity pairs trading and more than half of this loss is accounted for by the Royal Dutch/Shell trade.

The example of LTCM is a good illustration of why arbitrage by financial institutions has not succeeded in eliminating the mispricing in DLCs. An important characteristic of DLC arbitrage is that the underlying shares are not convertible into each other. Hence, risky arbitrage positions must be kept open until prices converge. Since there is no identifiable date at which DLC prices will converge, arbitrageurs with limited horizons who are unable to close the price gap on their own face considerable uncertainty. De Jong, Rosenthal, and van Dijk (2008) simulate arbitrage strategies in twelve DLCs over the period 1980-2002. They show that in some cases, arbitrageurs would have to wait for almost nine years before prices have converged and the position can be closed. In the short run, the mispricing might deepen. In these situations, arbitrageurs receive margin calls, after which they would most likely be forced to liquidate part of the position at a highly unfavorable moment and suffer a loss. As a result, arbitrage strategies in DLCs are very risky, which is likely to impede arbitrage.
