= Listing (finance) =

Allowing trading of a company's shares

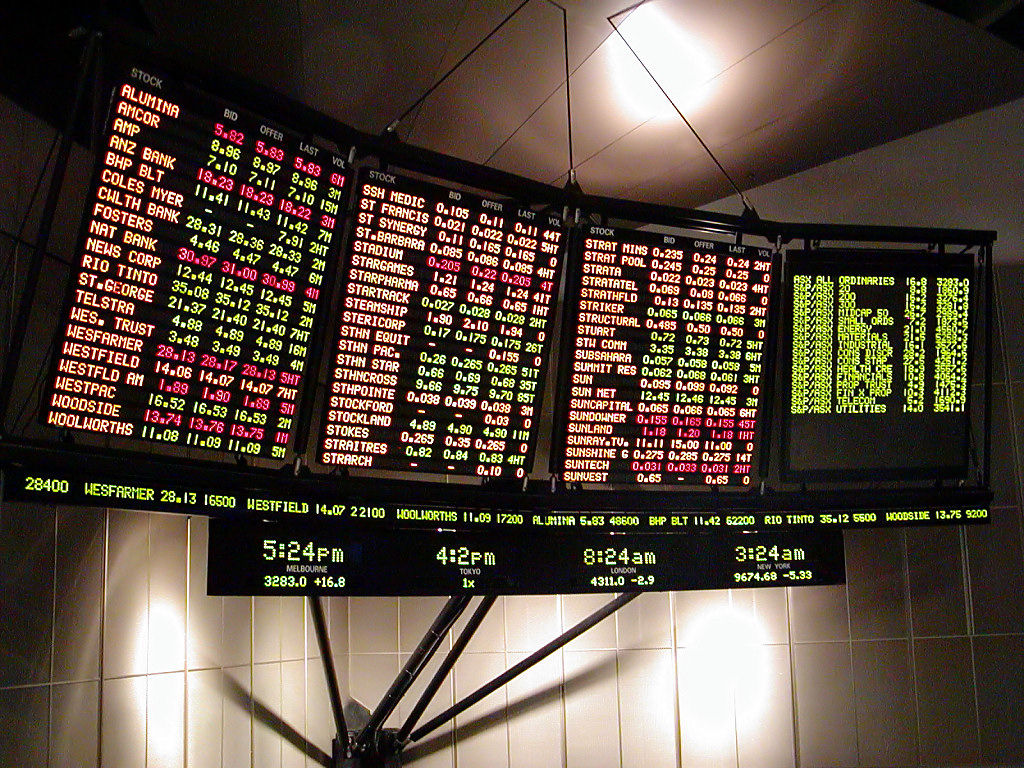

In corporate finance, a listing refers to the company's shares being on the list (or board) of stock that are publicly listed. Some stock exchanges allow shares of a foreign company to be listed and may allow dual listing, subject to conditions.

Normally the issuing company is the one that applies for a listing but in some countries an exchange can list a company, for instance because its stock is already being traded via informal channels.

Stocks whose market value and/or turnover fall below certain levels may be delisted by the exchange. Delisting often arises from a merger or takeover, or the company going private.

== Requirements ==
Each stock exchange has its own listing requirements or rules. Initial listing requirements usually include supplying a history of a few years of financial statements (not required for "alternative" markets targeting young firms); a sufficient size of the amount being placed among the general public (the free float), both in absolute terms and as a percentage of the total outstanding stock; an approved prospectus, usually including opinions from independent assessors, and so on.

=== Examples ===
The listing requirements imposed by some stock exchanges include:

- New York Stock Exchange: the New York Stock Exchange (NYSE) requires a company to have issued at least one million shares of stock worth $100 million and must have earned more than $10 million over the last three years.
- NASDAQ Stock Exchange: NASDAQ requires a company to have issued at least 1.25 million shares of stock worth at least $70 million and must have earned more than $11 million over the last three years.
- London Stock Exchange: the main market of the London Stock Exchange requires a minimum market capitalization of £700,000, three years of audited financial statements, a minimum public float of 25% and sufficient working capital for at least 12 months from the date of listing.
- Bombay Stock Exchange: the Bombay Stock Exchange (BSE) requires a minimum market capitalization of ₹250 million (US$2.7 million) and minimum public float equivalent to ₹100 million (US$1.1 million).

== Delisting ==
Delisting refers to the practice of removing the capital stock of a company from a stock exchange so that investors can no longer trade shares of the stock on that exchange. This typically occurs when a company goes out of business, declares bankruptcy, no longer satisfies the listing rules of the stock exchange, has become a private company, has become a subsidiary after a merger or acquisition, or wants to reduce regulatory reporting complexities and overhead, or if the trading volumes on the exchange from which it wishes to delist are below minimum thresholds.

In the United States, securities which have been delisted from a major exchange for reasons other than going private or liquidating may be traded on over-the-counter markets like the OTC Bulletin Board or the Pink Sheets.
