= Calling All Crows =

Calling All Crows EP

EP by State Radio
- Released: August 11, 2009
- Recorded: ???
- Genre: Reggae rock, alternative rock

State Radio chronology
Year of the Crow (2007)	Calling All Crows EP (2009)	State of Georgia EP (2009)

The Calling All Crows EP was released by reggae rock band, State Radio on August 11, 2009 as a preview for the upcoming album Let It Go, which was released September 29, 2009. It features three finished songs from Let It Go, and was released exclusively on Apple's iTunes Store as a showcase of that material.

== Track listing ==
1. Calling All Crows – 3:40
2. Knights of Bostonia – 4:27
3. Evolution – 3:55
