= The Evolution =

The Evolution may refer to:

- Ciara: The Evolution, 2006, or its title song
- The Evolution (Made Men Music Group album), 2014
- The Evolution (Crossfaith song), from Apocalyze, 2013

== See also ==
- Evolution (disambiguation)
