= Peter Barrett (illustrator) =

English illustrator

Peter Barrett designed and provided the artwork for a set of United Kingdom postage stamps depicting dogs in 1979. A commemorative first day cover was also brought out.

== Illustrations ==
Peter Barrett's career as an illustrator took off after writing and illustrating a three-book series for very young children, along with his wife Susan Barrett. Published by Ward Lock, the books (The circle Sara drew, The square Ben drew, The line Sophie drew) became very popular. Barrett subsequently concentrated on animal art and illustrations, illustrating numerous children's non-fiction books, specializing in dogs, horses and dinosaurs. His illustrations for Birdwatcher's Diary, by Roger Lovegrove, in 1982 drew critical acclaim.

A biographical perspective of his work was published in 1986 by his wife Susan Barrett titled "Travels with a wildlife artist: the living landscape of Greece". Peter Barrett illustrated the book and also contributed to the text. In the decades of the 1980s and 1990s, his stature as an animal artist and children's book illustrator has grown hand in hand. Peter Barrett illustrated reprints and collections of famous animal centric stories and books by Gerald Durrell, Desmond Morris and James Herriot. He illustrated a number of books under the highly popular Little Golden Books label for children. He has also illustrated the 1987 Random House edition of the children's classic The Wind in the Willows, by Kenneth Grahame.

== Bibliography ==
- The world's Christmas: Stories from many lands, written by Olive Wyon, illustrated by Peter Barrett; Fortress Press, London, 1965
- The circle Sara drew, written and illustrated by Peter Barrett and Susan Barrett; Ward Lock Ltd, London, 1970
- The square Ben drew, written and illustrated by Peter Barrett and Susan Barrett; Ward Lock Ltd, London, 1970
- The line Sophie drew, written and illustrated by Peter Barrett and Susan Barrett; Ward Lock Ltd, London, 1970
- The book of fantastic insects, by Jane Carruth, illustrated by Peter Barrett; Octopus Books, London, 1975
- The book of fantastic birds, by Jane Carruth, illustrated by Peter Barrett; Octopus Books, London, 1975
- A closer look at elephants, written by John Holbrook, illustrated by Peter Barrett; Penguin Books, London, 1976
- A closer look at prehistoric mammals, written by L.B. Halstead, illustrated by Peter Barrett; Closer Look Books, London, 1976
- A closer look at horses, written by Neil Thomson, illustrated by Peter Barrett; Penguin Books, London, 1977
- The amazing fact book of birds, by Rosalind Lenga, illustrated by Peter Barrett; A & P Books, London, 1978
- The amazing fact book of insects, by Casey Horton, illustrated by Peter Barrett; A & P Books, London, 1979
- The duck, by Erica Proper and Arthur Proper, illustrated by Peter Barrett; Macdonald Educational, London, 1979
- The wonderful world of nature, by Maurice Burton, illustrated by Peter Barrett, Elizabeth Cooper and Michel Cuisin; Octopus Books, London, 1979
- Horses, ed. Henry Pluckrose, illustrated by Peter Barrett and Maurice Wilson; Franklin Watts, London, 1979
- A countryman's year, by Alan C. Jenkins, illustrated by Peter Barrett; Webb and Bower, Exeter, 1980
- Birdwatcher's Diary, by Roger Lovegrove, illustrations by Peter Barrett; Hutchinson, London, 1982
- Birds, by Tessa Board, illustrated by Peter Barrett; Franklin Watts, London, 1983
- Mammals, by Tessa Board, illustrated by Peter Barret; Franklin Watts, London, 1983
- (More About) The Duck, Vol. 4, by Anne-Marie Dalmais and Arthur Proper, illustrations by Peter Barrett; Rourke Publishing, USA, 1983
- Only One Woof, by James Herriot, illustrated by Peter Barrett; Michael Joseph / Adam & Charles Black, London, 1983
- Moses the Kitten, by James Herriot, illustrated by Peter Barrett; Michael Joseph / Adam & Charles Black, London, 1984
- Travels with a wildlife artist: the living landscape of Greece, written by Peter and Susan Barrett; Columbus Books, London, 1986
- The Wind in the Willows, by Kenneth Grahame, illustrated by Peter Barrett; Random House, London, 1987
- My family and other animals, by Gerald Durrell, illustrated by Gerald Durrell and Peter Barrett; Grafton Books, London, 1987
- Dinosaur Discoveries (Big Little Golden Books), by Robert A. Bell, illustrated by Peter Barrett; Goldencraft, Racine, Wisconsin, 1988
- Horses and Ponies, by Rosanna Hansen, illustrated by Peter Barrett; Little Golden Books, NY, 1988
- My first book of animals, by Jenny Wood, illustrated by Peter Barrett and John Butler; Little Brown and Co, London, 1989
- After the Dinosaurs: The Story of Prehistoric Mammals and Man (Big Little Golden Books), by James C. Shooter, illustrations by Peter Barrett; Goldencraft, Racine, Wisconsin, 1989
- Amazing Dinosaur Facts, written by Robert Bell, illustrated by Peter Barrett; Golden Books, NY, 1990
- All About Wild Animals, by John Messenger (hardcover) / Michael Chinery (paperback), illustrated by Peter Barrett; Kingfisher Books, London, 1991
- James Herriot's Treasury for Children, by James Herriot, illustrated by Peter Barrett and Ruth Brown; St. Martin's Press, New York, 1992
- Don't wake the animals, by Annie Ingle, illustrated by Peter Barrett; Random House, London, 1992
- Dinosaur babies, by Lucille Recht Penner, illustrated by Peter Barrett; Random House, London, 1992
- A forest tree house, by Sheryl A. Reda, illustrated by Peter Barrett; World Book, USA, 1992
- The glow-in-the-dark dinosaur skeletons, by Annie Ingle, illustrated by Peter Barrett; Random House, London, 1993
- Find out about lions and tigers, by Jill Hughes and Richard Orr, illustrated by Peter Barrett and Maurice Wilson; Trafalgar Square, London, 1993 (1985?)
- The World of Animals, by Desmond Morris, illustrated by Peter Barrett; Jonathan Cape, London, 1993
- S-s-snake !, by Lucille Recht Penner, illustrated by Peter Barrett; Random House, London, 1994
- I Can Read About Baby Animals, by Elizabeth Warren, illustrated by Peter Barrett; Troll Communication, NY, 1995
- A day in the life of a baby bear, by Susan Barrett, illustrated by Peter Barrett; Whistlestop Publications, 1996
- A day in the life of a baby deer, by Susan Barrett, illustrated by Peter Barrett; Whistlestop Publications, 1996
- A day in the life of a baby dinosaur, by Lee Randall, illustrated by Peter Barrett; Whistlestop Publications, 1996
- A day in the life of a puppy, by Susan Barrett, illustrated by Peter Barrett; Whistlestop Publications, 1997
- A day in the life of a kitten, by Susan Barrett, illustrated by Peter Barrett; Whistlestop Publications, 1997
- I Can Read About Manatees, by Janet Palazzo-Craig, illustrated by Peter Barrett; Troll Communication, NY, 1998
- I didn't know that only some big cats can roar, by Claire Llewellyn, illustrated by Peter Barrett, Jonathan Pointer and Jo Moore; Millbrook Press, London, 1999
- Extinct! Creatures of the past, by Mary Batten, illustrated by Peter Barrett; Golden Books, NY, 2000
- The world of horses, by Toni Webber, ed. Harriet Brown, illustrated by Peter Barrett; Millbrook Press, London, 2002
- Nature Unfolds: The Rocky Mountains and Deserts, by Gerard Cheshire, illustrated by Peter Barrett; Crabtree Publishing, USA, 2002
- Dia Y Noche En Los Bosques (Day And Night in the Forest), by Perez Villanueva, Luis Esteban, Peter Barrett and Susan Barrett; Ediciones Sm, USA, 2004
- Illustrated Encyclopedia of Birds of America: The Ultimate Guide to the Birds of the U.S.A., Canada, Central and South America, by David Alderton, illustrations by Peter Barrett; National Book Network, USA, 2004
- The Illustrated Encyclopedia of Birds of the World : The Ultimate Identification Guide to Over 1600 Birds, Profiling Habitat, Nesting, Behaviour and Food, by David Alderton, illustrations by Peter Barrett; National Book Network, USA, 2005
- James Herriot's Treasury of Inspirational Stories for Children, by James Herriot, illustrated by Peter Barrett and Ruth Brown; St. Martin's, New York, 2005
- Three Little Pigs: 65th Anniversary Edition, written and illustrated by Peter Barrett; Ladybird Books, London, 2005
- Evolution: The Story of Life, by Robert Palmer. University of California Press, Berkeley, 2009
