= Year of the Crow =

Studio album by State Radio
- Released: September 25, 2007
- Genre: Indie rock, rock, reggae
- Label: Ruff Shod
- Producer: Tchad Blake

State Radio chronology
Wicker Plane EP (2007)	Year of the Crow (2007)	Calling All Crows EP (2009)

Year of the Crow is the third full-length LP from reggae rock band State Radio, headlined by former Dispatch guitarist/vocalist, Chad Urmston. Originally it was set to be released on September 18, 2007, but due to manufacturing problems the release date was pushed back to September 25. The album was released in stores February 5, 2008.

== Tracks ==
1. "Guantanamo" - 3:03
2. "Unfortunates" - 2:21
3. "The Story of Benjamin Darling Part 1" - 3:57
4. "CIA" - 3:38
5. "Gang of Thieves" - 3:12
6. "Fight No More" - 5:50
7. "Barn Storming" - 3:35
8. "Rash of Robberies" - 6:43
9. "Omar Bay" - 4:14
10. "As With Gladness" - 3:44
11. "Wicker Plane" - 4:05
12. "Sudan" - 3:52
13. "Fall of the American Empire" - 10:26

"Fall of the American Empire" contains the hidden track "Sybil II" @ 8:40

== Personnel ==
State Radio

- Chetro - guitars, vocals, trombone
- Chuck - bass, organ, piano, vocals
- Mad Dog - drums, percussion, vocals

Guest artists

- Beth Porter - cello
- Tchad Blake - sundries
