= Cold Case season 7 =

Cold Case
- Season 7
- No. of episodes: 22

Release
- Original network: CBS
- Original release: September 27, 2009 – May 2, 2010

Season chronology
- ← Previous; Season 6

The seventh and final season of Cold Case, an American television series, began airing on CBS on September 27, 2009 and concluded on May 2, 2010. Season seven regular cast members include Kathryn Morris, Danny Pino, John Finn, Thom Barry, Jeremy Ratchford, and Tracie Thoms. Due to budget constraints, the entire main cast only appeared together in four episodes this season.

On May 18, 2010 more than 2 weeks after the series finale aired, CBS announced that the show would not be renewed for an eighth season due to low ratings. This season had an average of 9.86 million viewers and ranked 29th, being the least watched season of the series.

== Cast ==
Actor	Character	Main cast	Recurring cast
Kathryn Morris	Det. Lilly Rush	entire season	—N/a
Danny Pino	Det. Scotty Valens	entire season	—N/a
John Finn	Lt. John Stillman	entire season	—N/a
Thom Barry	Det. Will Jeffries	entire season	—N/a
Jeremy Ratchford	Det. Nick Vera	entire season	—N/a
Tracie Thoms	Det. Kat Miller	entire season	—N/a
Bobby Cannavale	Det. Eddie Saccardo	—N/a	episodes 3, 7, 8
Jonathan LaPaglia	ADA Curtis Bell	—N/a	episodes 1, 10, 13, 15, 20
Keith Szarabajka	Deputy Commissioner Patrick Doherty	—N/a	episodes 3, 17, 22
Daniel Baldwin	Major Maurice "Moe" Kitchener	—N/a	episodes 1, 5, 12-14
Johnny Messner	Senior SSA Ryan Cavanaugh	—N/a	episodes 18-20
Susanna Thompson	SSA Diane "D" Yates	—N/a	episodes 18-20

== Episodes ==
No. overall	No. in season	Title	Directed by	Written by	Original release date	Prod. code	US viewers (millions)
135	1	"The Crossing"	Alex Zakrzewski	Taylor Elmore	September 27, 2009	3X5451	9.19
After Lilly's car accident, she returns and investigates the disappearance of 24-year-old Darcy Curtis aboard a magnificent ocean liner in 1966. Long assumed to be a suicide, the case is re-investigated as a homicide when her remains are recovered. Moe's release on bail surprises everyone.: All songs in this episode are by Ray Charles.; Song featured in the intro: "I Got a Woman" by Ray Charles.; Song featured in the finale: "What Would I Do Without You?" by Ray Charles.
136	2	"Hood Rats"	Chris Fisher	Elwood Reid	October 4, 2009	3X5452	10.05
The team re-examines the 1995 murder of homeless 17-year-old amateur skateboarding prodigy Nash Simpson, who was trying to earn enough money through skating sponsors to get himself off the street, after his brother identifies his belongings upon arriving in Philadelphia. Note: Tracie Thoms appears only in the finale of this episode: Song featured in the intro: "Feel the Pain", by Dinosaur Jr.; Song featured in the finale: "Disarm" by The Smashing Pumpkins.
137	3	"Jurisprudence"	Holly Dale	Christopher Silber	October 11, 2009	3X5453	7.87
The 2004 case of Alex Caceres, a 17-year-old boy who was murdered while wrongfully imprisoned in a juvenile detention center, is reopened after new evidence suggests that he was innocent. Scotty is determined to bring justice to the victim, having been attempting to free Alex prior to his death. Stillman is forced to transfer personnel out of his department. Note: Jeremy Ratchford does not appear in this episode: Song featured in the intro: "In This World", by Moby.; Song featured in the finale: "None of Us Are Free" by Solomon Burke.
138	4	"Soul"	John F. Showalter	Ryan Farley	October 25, 2009	3X5454	9.30
The team reinvestigates the 1970 murder of Billy Sanders, a 20-year-old virtuoso jazz musician who was keeping his hard-partying lifestyle secret from his devoutly religious father, when his son arrives wanting to know more about him, having been born after his death. Note: Tracie Thoms does not appear in this episode: Song featured in the intro: "Son of a Preacher Man" (instrumental); played in-character by Billy Sanders; Song featured in the finale: "I'll Be Around" by The Spinners.
139	5	"WASP"	Chris Fisher	Denise Thé	November 1, 2009	3X5455	9.02
The team reopens the 1944 disappearance and murder of Vivian Lynn, a 22-year-old female pilot who was a member of the Women Airforce Service Pilots during World War II and was a professional fighter pilot. The team discovers that the plane she was flying in was sabotaged and must comb through the personnel at the base she worked at to find the culprit. Note: Tracie Thoms does not appear in this episode: Song featured in the intro: "Wild Blue Yonder"; Song featured in the finale: "I'll Walk Alone" by Martha Tilton.
140	6	"Dead Heat"	Nathan Hope	Adam Glass	November 8, 2009	3X5456	8.17
When the remains of Sonny Sandoval, a 45-year-old jockey who had been missing since 1986, are uncovered in an old horse grave, the team reexamines the circumstances of his disappearance. They soon discover that not only was Sonny retiring after his last race, but his personal life was going off the rails. Note: Tracie Thoms does not appear in this episode: All songs in this episode are by Santana.; Song featured in the intro: "Oye Como Va" by Santana.; Song featured in the finale: "Samba Pa Ti" by Santana.
141	7	"Read Between the Lines"	Kevin Bray	Erica L. Anderson	November 15, 2009	3X5457	9.59
The team reinvestigates the 1991 murder of Donalyn Sullivan, a 14-year-old aspiring rapper who was in foster care with her younger sister at the time of her death, when a convict discloses information that leads them to the primary crime scene. When the team stumbles upon her songbook, they discover that the lyrics could be the key to catching her killer. Note: Thom Barry does not appear in this episode: Song featured in the intro: "Sing a Song" by Earth Wind and Fire; Song featured in the finale: "Read Between the Lines" written by Jeff Moonie Jr. and performed by Danièle Watts.
142	8	"Chinatown"	David Von Ancken	Alicia Kirk	November 22, 2009	3X5458	9.55
When a Chinese woman discloses new information about her son's death, which Stillman worked on, the team reopens the 1983 murder of Jack Chao Lu, a 17-year-old Chinese-American boy whose death may have been connected to the killing of his girlfriend, a 17-year-old Vietnamese girl named Tam Sung, by Chinese gang members three months prior. However, they are hindered by the prejudiced community and a retired officer who appears to know more than he's letting on. Note: Jeremy Ratchford does not appear in this episode: Song featured in the intro: "Age of Consent", by New Order.; Song featured in the finale: "Every Breath You Take" by The Police.
143	9	"Forensics"	Holly Dale	Jerome Schwartz	December 6, 2009	3X5459	9.64
The team investigates the 1999 murder of Luke Cronin, an 18-year-old debater who supposedly committed suicide after losing his first debate at his new prep school, when new evidence points to his death being staged. Note: Tracie Thoms does not appear in this episode: Song featured in the intro: "All Star", by Smash Mouth.; Song featured in the finale: "Karma Police" by Radiohead.
144	10	"Iced"	Peter Medak	Taylor Elmore	December 13, 2009	3X5460	10.30
The team reopens the 1980 murder of Tommy Flanagan, an 18-year-old ice hockey player who was murdered on his team's ice rink on the same night the U.S. hockey team defeated the Soviet Union at the Winter Olympics, after the prime suspect comes forward with a viable alibi on the night the victim died. The only clue the team has on them is a broken hockey stick, so they must go through the victim's former teammates to find the culprit. Note: Thom Barry does not appear in this episode: All songs in this episode are by Bob Seger.; Song featured in the intro: "Ramblin' Gamblin' Man" by Bob Seger.; Song featured in the finale: "Against the Wind" by Bob Seger.
145	11	"The Good Soldier"	Gwyneth Horder-Payton	Christopher Silber	January 10, 2010	3X5461	10.38
The team investigates the 2005 murder of Mike Donley, a 28-year-old Army recruiter who was killed two days before his deployment to Iraq, and uncover evidence that he may have been involved in a pawnshop burglary that occurred the same night he was killed. Note: Jeremy Ratchford does not appear in this episode: Song featured in the intro: "I Don't Wanna Be", by Gavin DeGraw.; Song featured in the finale: "Politik" by Coldplay.
146	12	"The Runaway Bunny"	John Finn	Elwood Reid	January 17, 2010	3X5462	10.62
The team reopens the case of Harry Denton, a private investigator who was murdered in 1974 while working to track down a teenage runaway, when his bones are found in the cement foundations of a demolished building. Note: Thom Barry does not appear in this episode: Song featured in the intro: "Any Major Dude Will Tell You" by Steely Dan.; Song featured in the finale: "Forever Young" by Bob Dylan.
147	13	"Bombers"	Janice Cooke-Leonard	Gina Gionfriddo	February 14, 2010	3X5463	8.73
The team reinvestigates the 1982 murder of Carlos Espinosa, a talented 16-year-old graffiti artist who was killed by a fatal overdose of toxic paint, when his mother comes forward with his black book containing unfinished pieces of art, and soon discover a graffiti group that was harassing local artists. Note: Jeremy Ratchford does not appear in this episode: Song featured in the intro: "You Dropped a Bomb on Me" by The Gap Band.; Song featured in the finale: "Since You're Gone" by The Cars.
148	14	"Metamorphosis"	Chris Fisher	Adam Glass & Danny Pino	February 21, 2010	3X5464	8.81
The team reinvestigates the 1971 death of Mia Romanov, an 18-year-old circus aerialist when another circus performer comes forward with new evidence that indicates the girl was dead before the accident that supposedly killed her took place. Lilly comes under investigation by Internal Affairs after Moe Kitchener, the man who tried to kill her, is found murdered outside a bar in his car. Note: Thom Barry does not appear in this episode: All songs in this episode are by The Doors.; Song featured in the intro: "Light My Fire", by The Doors.; Song featured in the finale: "People Are Strange" by The Doors.
149	15	"Two Weddings"	Nathan Hope	Meredith Stiehm	February 28, 2010	3X5465	9.83
The resident police expert on fires and explosions, Louie Amante, is going to marry a woman whose previous fiancé, Dan Palmer, mysteriously died in 2008 after calling off their wedding. The team reopens the man's case to make sure that their colleague isn't about to marry a murderer; however, they quickly discover that there are more suspects than they thought, while the groom had secrets of his own. Note: Tracie Thoms does not appear in this episode: Song featured in the intro: "Sweet Thing", by Keith Urban.; Song featured in the finale: "Out Last Night" by Kenny Chesney.
150	16	"One Fall"	Don Thorin Jr.	Ryan Farley	March 14, 2010	3X5466	10.23
The team reopens the case of Mick "The Machine" Malone, a 28-year-old dock worker and young father who was moonlighting as an indy-circuit wrestler until he was shot dead in 1986, when the gun used to kill him is recovered. The team discovers Mick's wrestling career was putting a strain on his relationship with his son and ex-wife. Valens secretly looks into a lead on the man who mugged and raped his mother. Note: Jeremy Ratchford does not appear in this episode: Song featured in the intro: "Livin' on a Prayer", by Bon Jovi.; Song featured in the finale: "Wanted Dead or Alive" by Bon Jovi.
151	17	"Flashover"	Jeannot Szwarc	Greg Plageman	March 21, 2010	3X5467	9.43
Realizing that the missing Vera has finally hit rock bottom, his worried team members hope that a new twist to a 2006 arson case that killed two boys and brothers, which he was secretly obsessing about in recent weeks, might supply leads to his whereabouts. They soon find that the guilty man and the boys’ father, Joe Don Billingsley, was murdered and after reviewing the case, learns that he may not have been guilty as they thought.: All songs in this episode are by Pink Floyd.; Song featured in the intro: "Comfortably Numb" by Pink Floyd; Song featured in the finale: "Wish You Were Here" by Pink Floyd.
152	18	"The Last Drive-In"	Chris Fisher	Elwood Reid	March 28, 2010	3X5468	10.32
When ballistics tie a recent murder case of Rush's to a serial killer who has been inactive since 1983, a tough FBI agent with ties to Stillman shows up to enlist the team's aid in finding the killer who has eluded her for 27 years. Note: Thom Barry does not appear in this episode: Song featured in the intro: "Just What I Needed", by The Cars.; Song featured in the finale: N/A
153	19	"Bullet"	John F. Showalter	Christopher Silber	April 4, 2010	3X5469	10.10
After the investigation in the previous episode reveals the serial killer's identity - and some of his likely future targets - the team and the FBI work together to apprehend him while trying to locate and protect the people he's preparing to kill. Note: Jeremy Ratchford does not appear in this episode: Song featured in the intro: "Snake Song" by Townes Van Zandt; Song featured in the finale: "Keepsake" by State Radio.
154	20	"Free Love"	Jeffrey Hunt	Elwood Reid & Denise Thé	April 11, 2010	3X5470	9.86
An attraction grows between Rush and FBI agent Ryan Cavanaugh as they travel to upstate New York to investigate the 1969 murder of David Quinn, a soldier who attended Woodstock; the two discover the victim may have been involved with a state senator who attended Woodstock as well. Back in Philadelphia, Vera reconnects with his ex-girlfriend from high school when she asks him to investigate a break-in that occurred at her home. Note: Thom Barry does not appear in this episode: Song featured in the intro: "Darlin' Be Home Soon" by Joe Cocker.; Song featured in the finale: "The Weight" by The Band.
155	21	"Almost Paradise"	Alex Zakrzewski	Christopher Silber & Adam Glass	May 2, 2010	3X5471	9.64
The team reopens the 1989 case of Felicia Grant, a 17-year-old high school senior who was killed in a hit-and-run shortly after she was crowned prom queen, when photos from an old camera reveal that she was killed just 15 minutes after prom. Rush gets some disturbing news about her sister, Christina. Note: Tracie Thoms does not appear in this episode: Songs featured in the intro: "Bust a Move", by Young MC / "Almost Paradise", by Mike Reno and Ann Wilson.; Song featured in the finale: "All I Want Is You by U2.
156	22	"Shattered"	Jeannot Szwarc	Greg Plageman & Elwood Reid	May 2, 2010	3X5472	10.02
While Rush and Valens leave Philadelphia to find Rush's missing sister, Christina, Jeffries gets a lead in the 1993 murder of Wanda Johnson, a 15-year-old girl who was shot to death and dumped in a seedy part of the city. He and his team work on the case, hoping to fulfill the promise he made to her parents to find the killer. Note: This is the only episode of the series in which Rush does not work on a case.: All songs in this episode are by The Rolling Stones.; Song featured in the finale: "Winter" by The Rolling Stones.
