= Say Anything (party game) =

2008 board game

Say Anything is a board game designed by Dominic Crapuchettes and Satish Pillalamarri. It was released by North Star Games in 2008 as a follow-up to the award-winning Wits & Wagers.

== Gameplay ==
Say Anything is very similar to Wits & Wagers except players answer open-ended subjective questions instead of trivia questions. The goal of Say Anything is to get people talking about interesting things and laughing.

Each round, one player will play the role of the Judge. The Judge draws a card and then asks a question from it. Sample questions include:

- What would be the best thing to do on the moon?
- What would be the coolest thing to teach a monkey?
- What's the best action movie of all time?
- What's the most important invention of the past century?
- Who's the most annoying celebrity in show business?

Each of the other players then writes an answer on a dry erase board and places it face-up on the table. Once all of the answers are on the table, the Judge secretly chooses their favorite response. Each other player has two tokens to bet on the answer they think the Judge chose as their favorite. Players receive one point for each correct bet. The game ends after a set number of rounds, usually 20 or so.

== Reception ==
Say Anything has won many awards including the BoardGameGeek 2008 Party Game of the Year, and an Origins Award for 2008 Best Children's, Family or Party Game.
