= State Radio =

American rock band

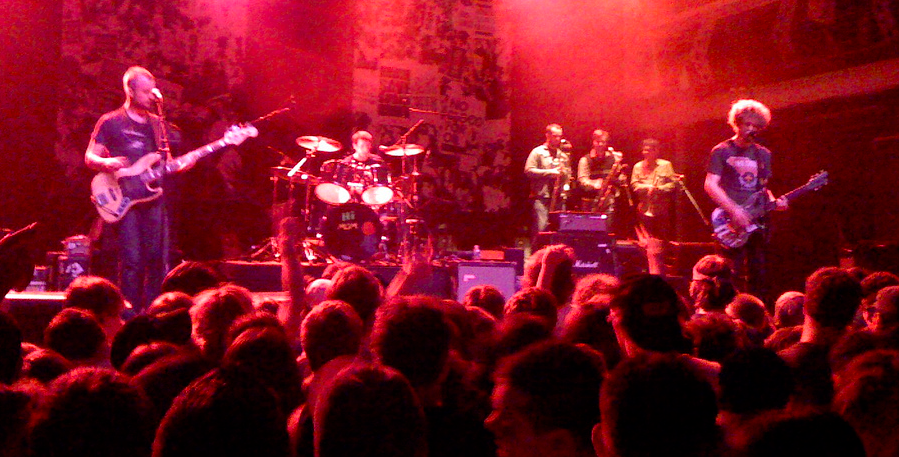
- State Radio performing in 2007

Background information
- Origin: Sherborn, Massachusetts, U.S.
- Genres: Alternative rock; reggae rock
- Years active: 2002–2013, 2026
- Labels: Fenway, Nettwerk, Ruff Shod
- Members: Chad Stokes Urmston
- Past members: Chuck Fay; Mike Najarian; Brian Sayers; Pete Halby; Matt Shardlow; Nikki Glaspie
- Website: stateradio.com

State Radio is a Boston-based rock trio comprising singer and primary songwriter Chad Stokes Urmston (also a member of Dispatch), bassist Chuck Fay, and, formerly, drummer Michael Najarian. The band's songs focus on social and political issues and have been musically described as a combination of reggae, punk and rock.

== Biography ==
Chad Urmston, whose previous band Dispatch disbanded in 2002, formed State Radio later the same year in Sherborn, Massachusetts with second guitarist Pete Halby, bassist Chuck Fay, and drummer Mike Greenfield. The band, originally known as Flag of the Shiners, released an eponymous debut EP on Fenway Recordings in late 2002. The EP was later re-released under the band's current name, however the title remained the same.

State Radio went on a temporary hiatus throughout 2003 as Urmston recovered from throat surgery. They returned to touring and recording in 2004 as a slimmed-down trio with new drummer Brian Sayers. The band released a second EP entitled Simmer Kane in March 2004. This EP was a departure in style from the debut EP Flag of the Shiners as it featured acoustic guitar and Erin Lashnits Coughlin ("Ras LC") on vocals. In December 2005, State Radio released its first LP, Us Against the Crown. After touring for a few months in support of this album, drummer Michael Najarian was brought in to replace Brian Sayers, playing his first show at Emo's in Austin, Texas. With this lineup, the band recorded and released their second album Year of the Crow in September 2007.

State Radio opened for Dave Matthews Band on May 30 and 31, 2008 in Burgettstown, Pennsylvania, and on June 3 and 4, 2008 in Camden, New Jersey. In August of that year, State Radio played at a concert near the 2008 Democratic National Convention alongside Rage Against the Machine and other politically active bands as an act of protest against the Iraq War.

Official recording sessions for State Radio's third album began on November 3, 2008, in North Brookfield, Massachusetts at Long View Farm Studios. The album, entitled Let It Go, was released on September 29, 2009. In support of the album, State Radio launched their winter 2010 U.S. tour, titled "Lefty Rides Again." State Radio also completed a small European tour during the last two weeks of March 2010. At the beginning of summer 2010, State Radio embarked on a cross-country tour, opening for John Butler Trio during their April Uprising North American Tour. The latter two were co-headlining shows. At the end of the summer, the band returned to Germany for several more festival dates.

In 2010, the band won Best Social Action Song from the 9th Annual Independent Music Awards for "Calling All Crows".

The band's fourth album Rabbit Inn Rebellion was released on October 23, 2012. Guest appearances on the album include backup vocals by Matt Embree, Darren Buck and Kevin Kinsella, violin by Sarah Parkington on "Take Cover," guitar by Johnny Trauma on "Black Welsh Mountain" and Milt Reeder on "Freckled Mary," and vocals as well as additional lyrics by Mackie Cromwell on "H.A.C.K.I.N. (Yeah Man)." A music video for "Freckled Mary" was released on October 15, 2012, directed by Michael Parks Randa.

In September 2013, it was announced on State Radio's website and on their Facebook page that Mike "Maddog" Najarian had left State Radio to pursue a career in finance. Chad wrote, "Above all, he drummed his ass off every night and it was an honor to share the stage with him and feel that mac truck energy coming from the kit."

== Discography ==
=== Studio albums ===
- Us Against the Crown (2006)
- The Barn Sessions (2007)
- Year of the Crow (2007)
- Let It Go (2009) U.S. #96
- Rabbit Inn Rebellion (2012)

=== Live Albums/EPs ===
- Live at the Sync (2005)
- State of Georgia EP (2009)
- Live at the Brattle Theater (2009)
- Live at the Boston Pavilion (2011)

=== EPs ===
- Flag of the Shiners EP (2002)
- Simmer Kane EP (2004)
- Peace Between Nations EP (2005)
- Wicker Plane EP (2007)
- Calling All Crows EP (2009)

=== Singles ===
- "Gang of Thieves" (2007)
- "Knights of Bostonia" (2009)

=== Compilation appearances ===
- "John Brown" on Chimes of Freedom: The Songs of Bob Dylan Honoring 50 Years of Amnesty International (2012)

== In the media ==
The band's song "Keepsake" was featured in the season three finale of Showtime's dark comedy Weeds. "Keepsake" was also featured at the end of the "Bullet" episode of Cold Case, and at the end of the seventh episode of the Hawaii Five-0 reboot.

In 2012, Kayem Foods, based in Chelsea, Massachusetts, used State Radio's songs "Right Me Up" and "Sybil I" in a series of hot dog commercials.

"Knights of Bostonia" was featured in the beginning of surf cinematographer Taylor Steele's film Innersection. The song was played during the opening section, in memory of Andy Irons.

== Activism ==
During a tour in support of the band's 2007 album Year of the Crow, State Radio launched service projects in each city the band visited, and Urmston's former band Dispatch briefly reconvened for a three-night charity performance at Madison Square Garden, with funds going toward Zimbabwe relief.

In 2008, State Radio started an activist group called Calling All Crows to "inspire public service" and "promote human rights." In 2009, the organization worked with Oxfam America's Stoves for Sudan Project, raising $100,000 through fan activism at concerts to purchase 5,000 stoves for Sudanese women.
