= Evolution: The Story of Life =

2009 book by Douglas Palmer

- The cover to the book
- Author: Douglas Palmer
- Illustrator: Peter Barrett
- Language: English
- Subject: Paleontology
- Genre: Nature
- Publisher: University of California Press
- Publication date: November 9, 2009
- Pages: 374
- ISBN: 0-520-25511-9

Evolution: The Story of Life is a non-fiction book by Douglas Palmer.
