= EVolution =

2012 European research project

EVolution is a research project funded by the European Commission under the 7th Framework Programme of the Green Cars initiative. It started on 1 October 2012 with a specified duration of 4 years. The objective of the project was to develop new materials that will significantly reduce the weight of the new generation of hybrid and electric vehicles.

Advanced materials were used to enable the development of novel super-lightweight hybrid components complying with safety standards and recycling constraints, and enable the design to incorporate a weight reduction of 40% over that achieved using the current state-of-the-art technologies. The goal of EVolution was to demonstrate the sustainable production of a 600 kg (1,300 lb) weight FEV by the end of 2015. The base for the industrial demonstrator is the NIDO from Pininfarina.

To this end, EVolution addressed the whole vehicle by prototyping, assembling, and disassembling the most representative components. These are made from raw polymers and aluminum alloys commonly used in the automotive industry so as to ensure compliance with the End-of-Life Vehicle directive which imposes stringent requirements on the disposal and recycling of motor vehicles. The project was coordinated by Professor, PhD Jesper deClaville Christiansen, and the technical coordination by Pininfarina.
