= Wits and Wagers =

2005 board game

Wits & Wagers
- Publishers: North Star Games
- Publication: 2005
- Genres: Trivia, Party, Wagering
- Languages: English
- Players: 3-7 players or teams
- Setup time: 2 minutes
- Playing time: 20-30 minutes
- Chance: Little, Question selection
- Age range: 10 and up
- Skills: Trivia, Gambling, Estimation
- Website: Official Site

Wits & Wagers is a board game designed by Dominic Crapuchettes and Nate Heasley. It is published by North Star Games. The first edition of the game was published in 2005, and the second edition was released in 2007. The game is designed for 3 to 7 players or teams.

== Gameplay ==
The game is played in seven rounds. One trivia question is asked each round, and each player gives a numerical answer to every trivia question. Players simultaneously place their written answers to the trivia question on the betting mat, and then bet on the answer they believe is closest to the right answer but not over it. The house pays players who choose the correct answer based on the odds marked on the board. The player with the most chips after the seventh question is the winner.

== Reception ==
Wits & Wagers has won over 20 awards, including the Mensa Select award, the Board Game Geek 2007 Party Game of the Year, and GAMES Magazine 2007 Party Game of the Year. German, French, Swedish, and Norwegian editions of Wits & Wagers were released in 2008. Spanish and UK editions were scheduled to be released in the spring of 2009. In 2021, the rights to Wits & Wagers was purchased by Mattel Games.

== Reviews ==
- Family Games: The 100 Best

== Video game ==
A video game adaptation of Wits and Wagers was released on May 7, 2008, on Xbox 360 via Xbox Live Arcade. The title was developed by Hidden Path Entertainment.
