= Flag of the Shiners =

Flag of the Shiners EP

EP by State Radio
- Released: 2002
- Genre: Indie, rock

State Radio chronology
Flag of the Shiners EP (2002)	Simmer Kane EP (2004)

Flag of the Shiners EP is the debut EP by reggae-rock band State Radio, headlined by former Dispatch vocalist/guitarist, Chad Urmston. It features a much heavier sound than Urmston's previous Dispatch material.

The album was originally released as an eponymous debut, when the band was still known as Flag of the Shiners.

On May 8, 2009, the band played Flag of the Shiners in its entirety at a show at Wilton High School.

In 2013, the band also played the album in its entirety at the House of Blues in Boston, Massachusetts to celebrate the album's 10 year anniversary.

== Track listing ==
1. Mountain – 5:10
2. State Inspector – 3:28
3. Gunship Politico – 6:45
4. Uncertain - 4:43
5. Ill Advised - 2:50
6. The Legacy Of Margaret Brown - 3:17
