= Evolution Group (South Africa) =

Financial services holding company

Evolution Credit Limited
- Trade name: Evolution Group
- Formerly: Real People Investment Holdings Limited
- Company type: Public
- Founded: 13 September 1999; 26 years ago
- Headquarters: Rosebank, Johannesburg; South Africa
- Key people: Norman Thomson; Chairman; Neil Grobbelaar; Executive director
- Revenue: ▼ZAR 839 Million (2019)
- Total assets: ▲ZAR 2 Billion (2019)
- Number of employees: 1,012 (2019)
- Website: Homepage

Evolution Credit Limited, previously known as Real People Investment Holdings Limited, is a financial services holding company with its headquarters in Rosebank, South Africa.

== Overview ==
Evolution Group is a South African-based financial services institution. Its subsidiaries specialise in providing home improvement finance, debt collection services and assurance products. The group has more than 1,000 employees.

== History ==
Evolution Group was incorporated as Real People Group on 13 September 1999. On 21 August 2013 the company converted into a public limited liability company.

As of 31 March 2019, the group has listed bonds on the NASDAQ OMX Stockholm.

== Group Businesses ==
The companies that compose the Real People Group include, but are not limited, to the following:

- DMC Debt Management (Proprietary) Limited – is a South African debt collection company, trading since 2001. The head office is situated in East London, South Africa.
- Real People Home Finance (Proprietary) Limited – offers loans up to ZAR 120 000 for customers to spend at over 600 participating hardware stores. The head office is situated in Rosebank, South Africa.
- Real People Assurance Company Limited – provides individual insurance policies. The head office is situated in East London, South Africa.

== Governance ==
Evolution Group is governed by a six-person board of directors, Norman Thomson as the chairperson and Neil Grobbelaar as the Group CEO.

== See also ==
- Financial Services
