= Cultural evolution (disambiguation) =

Cultural evolution is cultural change viewed from an evolutionary perspective.

It may also refer to:

- Behavioral ecology, the study of the evolutionary basis for animal behavior due to ecological pressures
- Cultural selection theory, studies of cultural change modelled on evolutionary biology
- Dual-inheritance theory, a specific framework for studying cultural evolution
- Memetics, neo-Darwinist view of the transmission of cultural traits
- Sociocultural evolution, the change of cultures and societies over time as studied in anthropology
