= Stuart West =

Stuart West FRS
- Stuart West receiving the 2026 Ig Nobel Prize
- Born: Stuart Andrew West; 1970 (age 55–56)
- Education: University of Cambridge (BA); Imperial College London (PhD)
- Awards: Philip Leverhulme Prize (2006); EMBO Member (2014); Royal Society University Research Fellowship
- Scientific career
- Fields: Behavioural ecology; Cooperation; Evolution; Evolutionary biology; Social evolution
- Workplaces: University of Oxford; University of Edinburgh; University of British Columbia
- Thesis: Reproductive strategies in parasitic hymenoptera (1995)
- Website: www.biology.ox.ac.uk/people/stuart-west

Stuart Andrew West FRS is an evolutionary biologist studying social evolution and a Professor of evolutionary biology in the Biology Department at the University of Oxford.

== Education ==
West completed the Natural Sciences Tripos as an undergraduate student at the University of Cambridge followed by a PhD at Imperial College London on reproductive strategies in parasitic hymenoptera.

== Career and research ==
West's primary research interests are in the area of social evolution, sex allocation theory and microbial evolution. His research has attracted media attention, and has been published in high profile journals such as Nature, Science, the Proceedings of the National Academy of Sciences of the United States of America and Current Biology. West uses theoretical and empirical approaches to explain the evolution of cooperation, communication, and sex ratio.

With with John Krebs and Nicholas Davies, West is the co-author of the textbook An Introduction to Behavioural Ecology.

=== Awards and honours ===
West was a distinguished junior scholar in residence at the Peter Wall Institute for Advanced Studies, University of British Columbia, Canada in 1999 and he has won the Philip Leverhulme Prize for Zoology (2006), the Scientific Medal of the Zoological Society of London (2006). He was elected a Fellow of the Royal Society (FRS) in 2026. He is a member of the European Molecular Biology Organization (EMBO) and a former holder of a Royal Society University Research Fellowship. He was awarded an Ig Nobel Prize in 2026, alongside fellow Oxford researcher Matilda Brindle and University of Florida researcher Catherine F. Talbot, for their work on reconstructing the evolutionary history of human kissing.
