= Simmer Kane =

Simmer Kane EP

EP by State Radio
- Released: 2004
- Genre: Indie, rock

State Radio chronology
Flag of the Shiners EP (2002)	Simmer Kane EP (2004)	Peace Between Nations EP (2005)

Simmer Kane EP is the second EP released by alternative rock band, State Radio.

== Track listing ==
No.	Title	Length
1.	"Keep Sake"	3:54
2.	"Heady Riser"	5:19
3.	"The Waitress"	4:52
4.	"Hopeless Tender"	5:18
