= Ninety One Limited =

South African investment holding company

- Formerly: Investec Asset Management SA
- Type: Public
- Traded as: JSE: NY1
- ISIN: ZAE000282356
- Industry: Financial services
- Incorporated: 2019; 7 years ago
- Founded: 1991; 35 years ago
- Headquarters: Cape Town, South Africa
- Area served: Worldwide
- Key people: Gareth Penny (Chairperson); Hendrik du Toit (CEO)
- Services: Asset management
- Operating income: ▼ R1.613 billion (2026)
- Net income: ▼ R1.610 billion (2026)
- Total assets: ▲ R14.839 billion (2026)
- Total equity: ▲ R12.875 billion (2026)
- Website: ninetyone.com/en/south-africa

Ninety One, formerly known as Investec Asset Management SA, is a South African investment management company. Founded in 1991, it is headquartered in Cape Town and listed on the JSE Limited.

== History ==
The company was established in 1991 by Hendrik du Toit, as Investec Asset Management. It was initially an independent asset management business within major South African private bank Investec.

In March 2020, Investec completed the demerger of its asset management business, Investec Asset Management SA. It was separated into the independently-listed Ninety One Group. The South African entity, Ninety One Limited, subsequently listed on the JSE Limited, while the UK entity, Ninety One plc, listed on the London Stock Exchange.

In the 2020 offer, it had been envisaged that 10% of the stock would be offered to the public but Investec controversially withdrew this commitment and decided to retain 25% (rather than 15% as originally planned) because of "market conditions".

Following the Russian invasion of Ukraine, in February 2022, the Financial Times revealed that the chairman of Ninety One Limited, Gareth Penny, was continuing to serve as chairman of Russia's largest diversified mining and metals company, Norilsk Nickel. After the newspaper described the situation as a "governance failure" on 15 March 2022, Penny resigned as chairman of Norilsk Nickel the following day.

In February 2026, Ninety One Limited acquired Sanlam Investment Management as part of a long-term strategic relationship between Ninety One and Sanlam. Under the agreement, Sanlam appointed Ninety One as its primary active asset manager for certain local and global investment products.

In March 2026, Ninety One returned to its redeveloped headquarters Cape Town CBD, where the company had originally been established. The headquarters was officially opened by South African President Cyril Ramaphosa.

== Ownership ==
As of March 2026, major shareholders in Ninety One Limited are:

Shareholder	Ownership
Forty Two Point Two	25.52%
Sanlam	12.52%
Public Investment Corporation	9.79%
Investec	9.26%
Allan Gray	6.48%
