= Evolution: Random Mutations =

Card game

Evolution: Random mutations
- Designers: D. Knorre, S. Machin
- Publishers: Rightgames RBG SIA
- Players: 2 to 4
- Playing time: 30-60 minutes

Evolution: Random Mutations is a card game created by Dmitriy Knorre and Sergey Machin in 2010. The game is inspired by the evolutionary biology. It was published by SIA Rightgames RBG. Publishing of the game was financed in Boomstarter. English, French and German game editions were published in 2014.

Two or more players create their own animals, make them evolve and hunt in order to survive.

Random Mutations is the remake of Evolution: The Origin of Species basic game published in 2010. New game shows the aspects of evolution better. Generation of traits is truly random, it is as a result of either positive or negative mutation. As a result of natural selection that plays out on the game – positive mutations remain more often than negative. One more important entity is the population of species. Game presentation was held on 15 December 2013.

== Rules ==
=== Place definition in match ===
The player with the largest number of victory points at the end of the game is the winner. The rankings of players in match are determined as follows:

1. number of victory points. Points are awarded to a player for all his surviving animals and their traits
2. number of cards in player's discard pile
3. throw of rolling dice

=== Game entities ===
- main deck. Each player fill up their own player's deck decks from main deck by drawing cards.

Card can be played as:

  - trait of species. If population of a species is more than 1, the player cannot add new trait to it.
  - species. It is a separate population of animals with the same set of traits. All the animals of a species obtain all the traits of a species.
  - animal . It increases the population of a species that already exists. As a rule it is prohibited to increase the animal population of a species above the total number of animal species a player has.
- food bank is the pool of tokens for animals. All tokens are divided into following types:
- red tokens (food). It's a food that an animal takes from food bank
- blue tokens (extra food) . It's a food that an animal gets using its traits.
- green tokens (shelters). An animal with a shelter token is invulnerable for carnivores.
- black tokens (parasites). This token can be played only on another player's animals. At the end of the extinction phase, the species with the most parasite tokens will have to discard one of its animals having at least one parasite token.

=== Preparation ===
One shuffles the main deck. Each player gets 7 cards in a row lying face down from the top of the deck. That is players' decks. Then each player receives additional 3 cards from the main deck creating first 3 species. Players roll dice to determine the first player.

=== The game turn structure ===
Each turn of the game consists of four phases:

1. development phase
2. climate phase
3. feeding phase
4. extinction and draw phase

During each phase players act in order moving clockwise. The player who can't or doesn't want to act passes. Each phase ends when nobody can or want to act.

=== Development phase ===
During the phase players can play their cards by putting them from their player decks onto the table or say "I pass" to stop playing cards. This phase consists of several rounds. Each round starting from the first player and going clockwise in order players play the top card from the player's deck.

Each player may play each card either as an animal for existing species or as a new species or a trait of an existing species. If player plays card a new species he placed it to the right of his already existing species. If card is played as a trait, it is put underneath the corresponding species. No species can have two identical traits. If a trait can't be played to a species it must be played on the right of the chosen one. If this species also cannot obtain the trait it moves on the right to the next species and so on. If no species can add the trait, the trait itself becomes a new animal species.

Some traits ("extremophile", "simplification") are negative. If negative traits is played on a species without any trait - player can choose either to remain it, or put as a new species.

=== Climate phase ===
The first player rolls dice of three colors to determine the amount of food, parasites and shelters that will be available in the next phase. The number of dice needed to roll is determined by the number of players.

number of players	food	parasites	shelters
2	Throw 2 red dice + 2	Throw 1 black dice	Throw 1 dice
3	Throw 3 red dice + 2	Throw 1 black dice	Throw 1 dice
4	Throw 3 red dice + 4	Throw 1 black dice	Throw 1 dice
5 (two decks)	Throw 4 red dice + 2	Throw 1 black dice	Throw 1 green dice
6 (two decks)	Throw 4 red dice + 4	Throw 1 black dice	Throw 1 green dice + 1
7 (two decks)	Throw 5 red dice + 2	Throw 1 black dice	Throw 1 green dice + 2
8 (two decks)	Throw 5 red dice + 4	Throw 1 black dice	Throw 1 green dice + 3

=== Feeding phase ===
Feeding phase consist of several rounds. During this phase players in order can:

- take one token from the table ad place it, by the rules, on their own or another player's animal. Red tokens (food) and green tokens (shelters) can only be placed on the player'd own animals; black tokens (parasites) can only be placed on animals of other players.
- use traits of species such as "carnivorous", "grazing", "bark beetle" and so on.

Animal needs 1 food token to be fed without additional food requirements. Trait that increased food requirement have corresponding number on the top left corner of a card.

Feeding phase ends when no player can\want play traits or all animals fed. Any remaining red tokens in the food bank are set aside.

=== "carnivourous" trait ===
Instead of taking red tokens an animal with "carnivorous"\"obligate carnivorous" trait can attack another animal of any player, attacker's owner as well. The only restriction is that it can't attack other animals in the same species as the carnivore. "Carnivorous" animal can attack only once during feeding phase. It cannot attack if it has already fed. Player of attacked species choose one animal of the species. This animal will be fed and put into corresponding player's discard piles.

There is plenty of traits defending animal from carnivorous: "high body weight", "mimicry", "running", "swimming", etc.

"Instinct" rule. An unfed carnivore must attack if there are no more tokens at food bank but there are species that can be attacked. It must attack even if the attacked species has a "poisonous" trait.

=== Extinction and draw phase ===
The players determine which animals managed to survive this turn and which became extinct.

1. Players determine which animals died of parasites. The species with the most parasite tokens discards one animal. The owner of that species chooses which animal dies but it must be an animal with at least one parasite token. Other animals with a parasite token will remain in game until they die with that token. Shelters cannot save animals from parasites. If there is a tie between two players on the highest number of parasite tokens both players must discard an animal.
2. Next, players determine which animal died of hunger. All unfed animals (animals that do not have the required number of red\blue tokens) die.
3. The cards of the dead animals are discarded into corresponding players' discard piles and all tokens on the placed back in the box. Only parasite tokens remain on animals.
4. Each player receives new cards from the main deck to his player deck. The number of cards received is equal to the number of player's animals, plus two.

The cards are drawn from the top of the main deck one card at a time starting with player one. If the deck should end some players may receive fewer cards than they should to their players decks.

Once the cards are drawn the turn ends. The player to the left of players one starts the new turn, he is now player one.

if a player has no animals on the table and no cards in his player deck, he receives a new players deck of 10 cards at the start of the turn.

=== End of the game ===
After the deck is empty the last turn begins. After the extinction phase of the last turn the victory points are counted. Each player is awarded victory points as follows:

- +2 points for each animal;
- +1 point for each trait
- +1 point for traits that increases the food requirement.

=== Rule treatment ===
Since there is a variety of possible game cases, many arguable points can appear while treating the rules. Most of issues are solved after looking the rules more closely. Also there is official FAQ with answers the most popular questions. Several rules were changed or elaborated in the next editions and after expansions were published.

== Expansions ==
Evolution has several expansion packs.

=== Full Expansions ===
==== Evolution. Plantarium ====
Evolution: Plantarium - official expansion published in 2016. New entities, traits, and rules where added:

- Plants - new entity to generate food. Plants can grow: the number of red food left on a plant determine the number of plant in next development phase. Thus an element of randomness disappeared in food aspect.
- Clymate phase is skipped in the game with Plantarium expansion.
- Plant trait. Player can put plant trait on a plant to make the plant suitable to player's animals or unsuitable to opponents' animals
- Some traits from other expansions have changes in their rules in order to be appropriate with new features.

=== Mini Expansions ===
==== Evolution: Variation ====
Evolution: Variation Mini-Expansion published in 2012 as a part of gift set and republished stand-alone in 2015. It consists of 18 additional cards delivered in gift set. It has additional cards both for Evolution: Random Mutations and Evolution: The Origin of Species.

== Game scenarios ==
=== "Divergence" scenario ===
Extra "Divergence" rule for experienced persons makes gameplay more similar to evolution process because "divergent evolution" game mechanics is added. Before starting the game players should arrange how to play : via default or divergence scenario.

In development phase player can add a new animal to an existing species dividing it into two separate independent species. The new animal will have all the traits of the divided species but can also acquire mutations of its own - while the new subspecies has one animal it can get new traits. A species divided this way can be divided again into new species.
