= Evolution Group =

Evolution Group plc
- Industry: Financial services
- Founded: 1999
- Headquarters: London, UK
- Key people: Martin Gray, Chairman; Alex Snow, CEO
- Revenue: £129.4 million (2009)
- Operating income: £11.1 million (2009)
- Net income: £9.2 million (2009)
- Parent: Investec

Evolution Group plc is a leading British-based financial services business. It is headquartered in London and is a former constituent of the FTSE 250 Index. It was acquired by Investec in 2011.

== History ==
The company, formed in 1999 as Evestment plc, was initially listed on the Alternative Investment Market. In 2000 it merged with Christows, a west country stockbroker. In 2001 it bought a research house known as Evolution Capital and changed its own name to Evolution Group.

It went on to merge with Beeson Gregory in 2002 and to acquire Williams de Broë in 2006.

On 12 November 2004, Evolution Beeson Gregory was fined £500,000 by the Financial Services Authority for executing trades that distorted the market. Evolution sold short 252% of the share capital of Room Service Group plc without any plan to settle the trades. Evolution's head of market making Christopher Potts was also fined £75,000.

It was acquired by Investec in 2011.

== Operations ==
The Group is organised into two activities:

- Evolution Securities: investment banking for mid-market companies
- Williams de Broë: stockbroking and fund management
