= The Barn Sessions =

Studio album by State Radio
- Released: 2007
- Genre: Rock; ska; reggae

State Radio chronology
Us Against the Crown (2005)	The Barn Sessions (2007)	Wicker Plane EP (2007)

The Barn Sessions is a studio album by American reggae rock band State Radio. It consists mostly of reworkings of songs from their previous record, Us Against the Crown, plus two previously unreleased tracks.

== Track listing ==
1. State I and I (State Inspector) – 4:18
2. Black Cab Motorcade – 3:50
3. People to People – 4:41
4. Olli Olli – 3:44
5. Calvados Chopper – 6:42
6. Right Me Up – 6:16
7. Rushian – 2:46
8. Camilo – 7:17
9. Diner Song – 4:09
10. Give You All My Time to Save – 3:28
