= North Star Games =

Board game publishing company

- Company type: Private
- Industry: Games (Board Games)
- Founded: 2003, College Park, Maryland
- Headquarters: Bethesda, Maryland
- Key people: Dominic Crapuchettes, Founder & Co-President; Satish Pillalamarri, Co-President
- Website: North Star Games Home

North Star Games is a board game publishing company based in Bethesda, Maryland and founded by Dominic Crapuchettes. The company has been publishing games since 2003 including Wits & Wagers, Say Anything, and Dirty Pig.

== History ==
Dominic Crapuchettes grew up designing and inventing board games since he was nine years old. He fulfilled a lifelong goal of starting a board game company in 2003 while attending Robert H. Smith School of Business at the University of Maryland, College Park. MBA classmate Satish Pillalamarri joined the company full-time after graduation in 2004. Crapuchettes and Pillalamarri raised money from friends, family and even faculty to fund the first run of Cluzzle board games. In time more games followed and North Star board games began to appear on the shelves of specialty gaming stores and later Target Corporation. When it came time to name the venture, founder Dominic Crapuchettes chose the name 'North Star' in reference to a stormy night off the coast of Alaska when the salmon fishing boat he was piloting lost electrical power and Crapuchettes was forced to use the North Star to guide the boat safely home. On that night, Dominic vowed to quit fishing and start the board game company that he had dreamed about since childhood. Wits & Wagers was included on many 'Best Games of Year' lists in 2007. The game was also awarded the 'Best New Party Game' by Games Magazine. Time Magazine highlighted Wits & Wagers as a "Lively trivia game" in a profile of games they determined as board game entertainment "beyond Monopoly". North Star Games' title, Say Anything, has been called, "A party game that appeals even to those who claim to hate party games."

== Games ==
- Cluzzle (2003): Family clay game where the object is to sculpt poorly.
- Wits & Wagers (2006): Party trivia game where you can bet on the answers of other players.
- Say Anything (2008): Opinion game designed to get people talking and laughing.
- Evolution (2014): A card-based strategy game where players try to evolve their species to out-compete other players in the quest for food.
- Happy Salmon (2016): A speedy card game where players get rid of their cards through physical activity with other players.
- Dirty Pig (2019): An easy-to-learn card game where the goal is to be the first player to dirty all your pigs.
- Oceans (2020): Players create marine species and earn points by keeping those species healthy.
- Paint the Roses (2022): A cooperative puzzle where players must work together to finish the Royal Gardens for the Queen of Hearts.
