= Let It Go (State Radio album) =

Studio album by State Radio
- Released: September 29, 2009
- Genre: Alternative rock, indie rock, reggae, punk rock
- Length: 49:58

State Radio chronology
State of Georgia EP (2009)	Let It Go (2009)	Rabbit Inn Rebellion (2012)

Professional ratings
Review scores
Source	Rating
Allmusic	link
Ultimate Guitar	link

Let It Go is the fourth full-length LP from reggae rock band State Radio. It was released on September 29, 2009. It is notable for being the first State Radio release available in vinyl format.

== Tracks ==
No.	Title	Length
1.	"Sybil III" (Pregap hidden track)	4:37
2.	"Mansin Humanity"	5:07
3.	"Calling All Crows"	3:38
4.	"Doctor Ron The Actor"	4:02
5.	"Arsenic & Clover"	3:06
6.	"Bohemian Grove"	4:35
7.	"Knights of Bostonia"	4:26
8.	"Let It Go"	3:12
9.	"Evolution"	3:55
10.	"Held Up By The Wires"	4:37
11.	"Blood Escaping Man"	3:32
12.	"Still & Silent"	6:36
13.	"Indian Moon" (Hidden track)	6:17

== Personnel ==
State Radio

- Chadwick Stokes - vocals, guitars, trombone
- Chuck Fay - bass guitar, vocals, melodica, mellotron, B3 organ, rhodes
- Mike "Maddog" Najarian - drums, percussion, vocals

Additional Musicians

- Don Monks - odds and ends
- Ben Urmston - backing vocals and trumpet
- Matt Embree - backing vocals on Still and Silent
- Jazer Giles - squeeze box, organ
- Aaron Dembe - backing vocals
- Dr. Ronnie Simonsen - tape cassette message
