= Water stop (disambiguation) =

A water stop is a railway stop where a steam locomotive can take on water.

Water stop or waterstop may also refer to:

- Waterstop, a watertight structure
- Water stop (sports) or water break, a break and a place to break for drinking water in some sports competitions
- "Waterstop" or Waterhouse stop was an early interchangeable aperture diaphragm
- "Water Stop", a song from the Gut the Van album
- "Water Stop", a song from the Silent Steeples album
