= Who Are We Living For? =

Studio album by Dispatch
- Released: October 10, 2000, November 9, 2004
- Recorded: December 1999 – May 2000
- Genre: Rock
- Length: 64:39
- Label: Bomber Records (Original Release), Universal Records (2004 Release)
- Producer: Dispatch

Dispatch chronology
Four-Day Trials (1999)	Who Are We Living For? (2000)	Gut the Van (2001)

Professional ratings
Review scores
Source	Rating
Allmusic	3.5/5 stars

Who Are We Living For? is a 2000 album by United States indie/roots folk band Dispatch. Their 4th studio album, it represented a major departure from past recordings. Unlike the first album, Silent Steeples, it is electric; unlike the second, Bang Bang, many of its songs express political messages. Specifically, Open Up, Time Served, Passerby, and Blood have clear political undertones. This could be seen as foreshadowing for the development of Dispatch member Chad Urmston's post-Dispatch music career (as frontman for State Radio).

In the album's booklet credits, the band members are referred to under their Dispatch aliases. Thus, Chad Urmston is "Chetro", Brad Corrigan is "Braddigan", and Pete Francis Heimbold is "Repete." The Title of the album, cover and case art of the album was created by William Quigley based on a 10 ft painting he made during the 1992 La Riots on his birthday April 29 entitled "Who are we Living for". As he was working on the painting the title came to him because of the Fear, Violence and Fires occurring right outside the walls of his then Los Angeles studio. Quigley also performed with the Band as a Dancer Pete named "Mr. Wiggles" from 1999 to 2006 in over 100 performances, while also designing some of the stages. The band started to develop a stage personality and highly charged show incorporating video, light, and performance as part of their act.

In 2004, Universal Records re-released Who Are We Living For with four additional tracks. They were added to end, making the album 21 tracks long. "Bulls on Parade" is a cover of the 1996 Rage Against the Machine single.

== Track listing ==
1. "Everybody Clap" (Dispatch)
2. "Open Up" (Urmston)
3. "Just Like Larry" (Urmston and Heimbold)
4. "Time Served" (Urmston)
5. "Even" (Urmston)
6. "Passerby" (Urmston and Heimbold)
7. "Carry You" (Heimbold)
8. "D. Bits" (Corrigan)
9. "How Now" (Dispatch)
10. "Lightning" (Heimbold)
11. "Granite" (Urmston)
12. "Prince of Spades" (Corrigan)
13. "Parade Speed" (Dispatch)
14. "Headlights" (Heimbold)
15. "Blood" (Corrigan)
16. "10 Ft., 5 Ft., Bag 'Em" (Dispatch)
17. "Douggie Mayu's" (Dispatch)
18. "Gone" (Urmston) ^{*}
19. "Spades" [Acoustic] (Corrigan) ^{*}
20. "Bulls on Parade" (Rage Against the Machine)
21. "5/4" (Dispatch) ^{*}

Tracks 1, 8, 9, 11, 13, 16, 17, and 21 are instrumental tracks.

* Tracks 18–21 are bonus tracks that are available on the 2004 re-release by Universal Records.

== Personnel ==
Dispatch

Chad Urmston - vocals, guitar, trombone, bass, percussion
Pete Heimbold - vocals, bass, guitar, slide bass
Brad Corrigan - vocals, drums, percussion, guitar, piano, harmonica
