= The General (Dispatch song) =

Song by Dispatch

from the album Bang Bang
- Released: July 1998
- Length: 4:06
- Label: Bomber; Foundations; Universal
- Songwriters: Brad Corrigan; Pete Heimbold; Chad Urmston
- Producer: Dispatch

"The General" is a song by the roots rock band Dispatch. It appeared on their 1997 album Bang Bang and became one of the group's most well-known songs.

== Composition ==
This song, written by Chadwick Stokes, tells a story about a brilliant and battle-torn 19th century general, who has a dream in which he realizes the futility of the war he is fighting.

In The Best of Dispatch, a book containing guitar and voice transcriptions of selected Dispatch songs, Chad Urmston describes "The General":

This was our anti-war song. Although it was primarily based on the Civil War, the message was not confined to that particular conflict. The song tells about General Robert E. Lee telling his Confederate army to basically go home and stop fighting. We were too young to be directly involved in the Gulf War; nevertheless, the sense of a troubled history rings loud in the heads of young men who grow up listening to grandfathers or fathers recount war stories. The crowd response to this song always blew us away. Some said it had a "Castles Made of Sand" feel - any reference to Hendrix we took gladly. We recorded the song up in the northeast kingdom on borrowed instruments. Our hazy-eyed hairball engineer swayed like a derelict wrecking ball over the console like a played-out carnie with nothing to show for a lifetime of swindling. His down-to-the-filter cigarette wandered listlessly with a skeletal droop of ash as he leaned on his crippled office chair teasing gravity. He ended up giving in to his heavy eyes and passing out on the couch with his feet up, still holding the cigarette as Brad and I took turns pressing the "record" and "locate" buttons.

== Formats ==
The song has appeared in multiple formats, including its original version on the album Bang Bang, as well as multiple live versions on their albums Gut the Van, All Points Bulletin and, most recently, Dispatch: Zimbabwe. In the Madison Square Garden format, the song features several instruments including the trumpet, saxophone, and trombone, an addition never before featured in the song.

At New York City's Radio City Music Hall in 2012, during the band's Circles Around the Sun tour, the song was performed with a verse from Nena's "99 Red Balloons" in the inserted bridge. This, presumably, to add new character to the band's anti-war message.

== Russian version ==
The band released a Russian language version in April 2022 in response to the invasion of Ukraine, with proceeds from streaming going toward the Leleka Foundation. Olga Berg, a friend of a friend of Stokes, translated the original lyrics into Russian. The re-recording was a gesture of solidarity with Russians against their country's involvement in the war.

== See also ==
- List of anti-war songs
