= Ain't No Trip to Cleveland Vol. 1 =

Live album by Dispatch
- Released: June 4, 2013
- Genre: Rock
- Label: Bomber Records
- Producer: Dispatch

Dispatch chronology
Circles Around the Sun (2012)	Ain't No Trip to Cleveland Vol. 1 (2013)

Ain't No Trip to Cleveland Vol. 1 is a 2013 live album by United States indie/roots folk band Dispatch consisting of songs taken from performances since their reformation in 2011. The record was announced on April 22, 2013 on the band's website and via a song premiere on Rolling Stone. Made available the same day, the pre-order includes various bundle packages.

== Track listing ==
Disc #1 track listing:

1. Get Ready Boy
2. Open Up
3. Circles Around the Sun
4. Flying Horses
5. Beto
6. Passerby
7. Two Coins
8. Broken American
9. Prince of Spades
10. Mother & Child Reunion
11. Josaphine
12. Walk With You
13. The General

Disc #2 track listing:

1. Con Man
2. Here We Go
3. Bats in the Belfry
4. Flag
5. Sign of the Times
6. Bang Bang
7. Never or Now
8. Melon Bend
9. Past the Falls
10. Feels So Good
11. Outloud
12. Valentine
13. Elias
