= William Quigley =

William Quigley may refer to:

- William Quigley (artist) (born 1961), American painter
- William Quigley (coach) (1890–?), American college football player and coach
- William P. Quigley, law professor
