= Dispatch: Zimbabwe =

Dispatch: Zimbabwe - Live at Madison Square Garden

Video by Dispatch
- Released: 2007
- Recorded: July 2007
- Genre: Rock
- Producer: Dispatch

Dispatch chronology
The Last Dispatch (2005)	Dispatch: Zimbabwe - Live at Madison Square Garden (2007)

Dispatch: Zimbabwe is a live DVD recording by American indie rock band Dispatch, recorded July 14 and 15, 2007 at Madison Square Garden in New York. The concert acted as both a reunion for the band, as well as a fundraiser, with proceeds from the concert ticket sales going to charities that fight disease, famine and social injustice in Zimbabwe.

== Track listing ==
1. "Here We Go"
2. "Time Served"
3. "Whaddya Wannabe"
4. "Open Up"
5. "Bulletholes"
6. "Bang Bang" (w/ the African Children's Choir)
7. "Ride a Tear"
8. "Passerby"
9. "Flying Horses" (w/ Bongo Love)
10. "Past The Falls"
11. "Fallin'"
12. "Lightning"
13. "Steeples" (from Wimpy)
14. "Questioned Apocalypse" (from Wimpy)
15. "Cut It Ya Match It"
16. "Bats In The Belfry"
17. "Elias" (w/ the African Children's Choir)
18. "Outloud" (w/ the African Children's Choir)
19. "The General"

Additional Songs:

1. "War" (w/ Bongo Love)
2. "Camilo"
3. "Customs"
4. "Carnival"
