= The Last Dispatch =

- Promotional poster for The Last Dispatch
- Directed by: Helmut Schleppi
- Produced by: Shane Marie Gilbert; Brady Nasfell; Kurt Schemper
- Starring: Chad Urmston; Pete Heimbold; Brad Corrigan special appearance by Mr Wiggles William Quigley, piano Paul Tillotson & Wimpy
- Distributed by: Fabrication Films
- Release date: July 29, 2005
- Running time: 81 minutes
- Language: English

The Last Dispatch is a documentary film by Helmut Schleppi overviewing and giving insight into the final days of the indie rock band Dispatch, which culminated with two final live concerts. The first concert took place at the Somerville Theatre to a very exclusive crowd. Two days later, on July 31, 2004, the band performed a free concert at the Hatch Shell in Boston. It was estimated that the turnout would only be between 10,000 and 30,000 people. In the end, the crowd grew to reach a reported 110,000 fans. A CD release, All Points Bulletin, features two discs of the two concerts and a DVD featuring selections from both shows.

== Release ==
The film was originally released in 2005, where The Last Dispatch saw its first premiere at Somerville Theatre in Somerville, Massachusetts from July 28 to July 31. A portion of the profits from the movie were given to the band's favorite charity, Elias Fund. Premieres at both New York's Village East Cinemas and Chicago's Park West Theater followed, where the film opened on April 21 and 28, respectively.

The Last Dispatch was released on DVD on September 26, 2006. The only special feature was a Theatrical Trailer.
