= Under the Radar (Dispatch album) =

Live album by Dispatch
- Released: 2002
- Genre: Rock
- Label: Bomber Records, Hollywood Records
- Producer: Braddigan

Dispatch chronology
Gut the Van (2001)	Under the Radar (2002)	All Points Bulletin (2004)

Under the Radar is a 2002 documentary DVD of the band Dispatch. It also includes a bonus CD entitled "Patchwork", which includes remixes of Dispatch songs and audio recordings of some of the performances on the DVD.

== Track listing ==
=== DVD ===
1. Intro
2. "Cover This"
3. Napster
4. "Mission"
5. "Two Coins"
6. To Begin
7. "Passerby"
8. Days Inn
9. "One Truth"
10. "Open Up"
11. Bearsville
12. "Time Served"
13. "Elias"
14. Wimpy
15. "Bullet Holes"
16. "Walk With You"
17. Jack Gauthier
18. "Bang Bang"
19. Lavish McTavish
20. "Even"
21. "Gasoline Dreams"
22. R'opera
23. Quigley
24. "Lightning"
25. "Prince of Spades"
26. "Flying Horses"
27. "Fat Ol' Pig"
28. "Mayday"
29. "Bats in the Belfry"
30. "Amazing Grace"
31. "The General"
32. Credits
33. Goodbye

=== CD: Patchwork ===
1. "Bang Bang (Remix)"
2. "The General (Remix)"
3. "One Truth"
4. "Gasoline Dreams"
5. "Mayday"
6. "Walk With You"
7. "Fat Ol' Pig"
