= All Points Bulletin (album) =

Live album by Dispatch
- Released: 2004
- Recorded: July 29–31, 2004
- Genre: Rock
- Length: Disc 1: 78:20; Disc 2: 73:19
- Label: Universal
- Producer: Dispatch

Dispatch chronology
| Under the Radar (2002) | All Points Bulletin (2004) | Zimbabwe (2007) |

Professional ratings
Review scores
| Source | Rating |
|---|---|
| AllMusic | 3/5 stars |

All Points Bulletin is a 2004 live album by American indie/roots folk band Dispatch. Much like their previous live album Gut the Van, the album was released onto two discs. The first is entitled "Somerville" and captures the band's intimate "warm-up" gig prior to their free performance to approximately 110,000 fans on the second disc, entitled "Hatch Shell." The purchase of the double album also includes a DVD recording of both performances.

== Track listing ==
All tracks written by Dispatch, except "Out Loud", which contains a portion of Bob Marley's and Peter Tosh's songs "Stir It Up" and "Get Up, Stand Up". All songs recorded live in concert, 2004.

=== Disc 1: Somerville ===
1. "Open Up" – (5:05)
2. "Time Served" – (4:52)
3. "Here We Go" – (8:31)
4. "Cover This" – (5:13)
5. "Riddle" – (5:38)
6. "Bang Bang" – (6:19)
7. "Ride a Tear" – (7:45)
8. "Lightning" – (6:16)
9. "Mayday" – (7:11)
10. "Even" – (5:01)
11. "Passerby" – (7:36)
12. "Prince of Spades" – (8:53)

=== Disc 2: Hatch Shell ===
1. "Past the Falls" – (7:25)
2. "Bulletholes" – (5:34)
3. "Fallin'" – (5:42)
4. "Two Coins" – (5:07)
5. "Bridges" – (6:52)
6. "Elias" – (7:31)
7. "Carry You" – (6:59)
8. "Bats" – (9:58)
9. "Outloud" – (10:04)
10. "General" – (8:07)

=== DVD ===
Live at Somerville Theater (July 28, 2004)

1. "Open Up"
2. "Time Served"
3. "Here We Go" @
4. "Bang Bang"
5. "Ride a Tear (Pete Francis)" @
6. "Mayday" $
7. "Even"
8. 'Mission"

Live at the Hatch Shell (July 31, 2004)

1. "Past The Falls" $
2. "Two Coins" ~
3. "Passerby" +
4. "Riddle (State Radio)"
5. "Fallin' (Braddigan)"$ ^
6. "Bridges" +
7. "Prince of Spades" +
8. "Headlights"
9. "Elias"
10. "Carry You" + ~
11. "Bats in the Belfry"
12. "Outloud"
13. "The General"
14. "Ending Credits – Dem Shoes"

@Feat Craig Dreyer [Saxophone]
$Feat Brian Sayers [Drums]
+Feat Phil Keaggy [Guitar]
^Feat Reinaldo de Jesus [Percussion]
~Feat Paul Tillotson [Keyboards]
