= Four-Day Trials =

Studio album by Dispatch
- Released: 1999/2004
- Genres: Alternative rock, reggae fusion
- Length: 39:20
- Labels: Bomber, Foundations, Universal
- Producer: Dispatch

Dispatch chronology
Bang Bang (1997)	Four-Day Trials (1999)	Who Are We Living For? (2000)

Professional ratings
Review scores
Source	Rating
AllMusic	4/5 stars

Four-Day Trials is a 1999 album by American indie/roots folk band Dispatch. The album was their third studio release. The tracks "Here We Go" and "Mission" are re-recordings of tracks from Dispatch's second album, Bang Bang.

== Track listing ==
Four-Day Trials track listing

1. "What Do You Wanna Be" (Urmston)
2. "Bullet Holes" (Heimbold)
3. "Wide Right Turns" (Urmston)
4. "Here We Go" (Urmston)
5. "Cover This" (Urmston)
6. "Mission" (Urmston and Heimbold)
7. "Hubs" (Heimbold)
8. "Root Down" (Beastie Boys Cover)
9. "Headlights" (Heimbold)
10. "(Hidden Track)"

== Remastered version ==
A later remastered reissue of the album released in 2004 included the following bonus tracks after the hidden track following "Headlights":

- "Fats" (Dispatch)
- "Whaddya Wanna Be" (Dispatch)
- "Dem Shoes" (Dispatch)

== Personnel ==
- Brad Corrigan - vocals, drums
- Chad Urmston - vocals, guitar, bass
- Pete Heimbold - vocals, bass, guitar
