= America, Location 12 =

Studio album by Dispatch
- Released: June 2, 2017
- Genre: Indie rock
- Label: Bomber Records
- Producer: John Dragonetti, Mike Sawitzke

Dispatch chronology
Circles Around the Sun (2012)	America, Location 12 (2017)	Location 13 (2018)

Singles from America, Location 12
- 1. "Only the Wild Ones" Released: February 10, 2017; 2. "Skin the Rabbit" Released: April 21, 2017; 3. "Painted Yellow Lines" Released: September 15, 2017; 4. "Midnight Lorry" Released: April 6, 2018

Professional ratings
Review scores
Source	Rating
AllMusic	4/5 stars
classicrock.net	7/10
Musikexpress	4/6 stars
PopMatters	7/10

America, Location 12 is a 2017 album by United States indie/roots folk band Dispatch. It is their sixth full-length studio album, the first recorded in five years.

== Production ==
The band began working on the album nearly two years before its release. Before recording, Chad Urmston told the other two members of the band that he wanted to be the "captain" for the upcoming album, a proposal they readily accepted. He had retreated to a cottage for a winter and wrote 25 to 30 songs, which differed from their previous material so significantly that a manager asked Urmston whether he disliked their old songs. The songs' material concerns "veterans coming home, childhood memories, [and] being a parent."

The band recorded the album in Panoramic Studios at Stinson Beach, California, which was built in the 1960s and features vintage analogue gear. The album was produced by John Dragonetti of The Submarines and Mike Sawitzke of The Eels, and was mastered by Dave Cooley.

A short series of videos was recorded with OurVinyl to document the making of the album. Much of the focus was on the improvement in the bandmates' interpersonal relations compared with their breakup in 2004.

== Release ==
The album was announced in February 2017 along with tour dates. Between the announcement and the release, the album was made available for pre-order with various rewards, including merchandise, concert tickets, and Skype interviews and pick-up basketball with band members.

In March, three months before the album's release, Pete Heimbold announced on the band's public Facebook page that he was taking a leave of absence from the band, including from the tour dates, as he was battling chronic depression. Guest musicians have been present at live performances and on tour.

Five songs were released in advance on YouTube between the announcement and the release, as well as live acoustic performances. This resulted in other artists covering songs even before the album's release, something the band encouraged. On the day of the album's release, the band uploaded the full album to be streamed for free.

"Only the Wild Ones", the first single and the first pre-released track, reached No. 9 on Billboard's AAA chart, marking the band's highest position to date on that chart and their first top 20 track on the radio.

== Track listing ==
No.	Title	Length
1.	"Be Gone"	6:00
2.	"Only the Wild Ones"	4:13
3.	"Curse + Crush"	4:18
4.	"Painted Yellow Lines"	5:20
5.	"Skin the Rabbit"	3:41
6.	"Midnight Lorry"	5:39
7.	"Begin Again"	2:53
8.	"Rice Water"	4:35
9.	"WindyLike"	4:59
10.	"Ghost Town"	3:05
11.	"Atticus Cobain"	3:48

== Charts ==
Chart (2017).	Peak position
US Billboard 200	80
US Independent Albums (Billboard)	4
US Top Rock Albums (Billboard)	15
