= Dispatch (band) =

American indie rock band

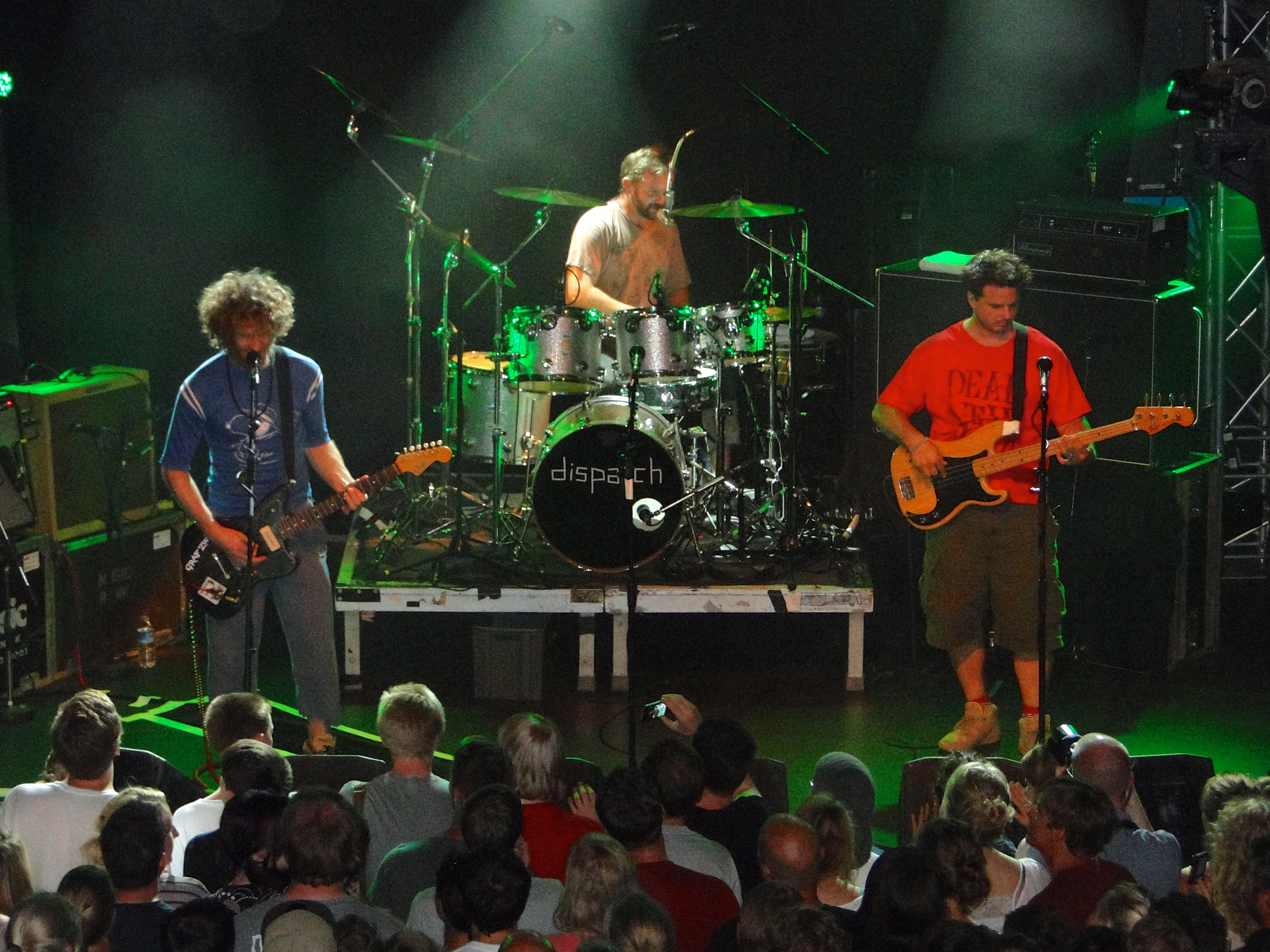
- Dispatch performing in Germany, 2012

Background information
- Origin: Middlebury, Vermont, U.S.
- Genres: Jam band; indie folk; roots rock; reggae fusion; rap rock; ska
- Years active: 1996–2002, 2004, 2007, 2009, 2011–present
- Labels: Bomber; DCN Records; Universal
- Members: Chad Urmston; Brad Corrigan; Matt Embree
- Past members: Pete Heimbold
- Website: dispatchmusic.com

Dispatch is an American indie/roots band. The band consists of Brad Corrigan (vocals, drums, guitar, percussion, harmonica) and Chad Urmston (vocals, guitar, bass, percussion). The band's original bassist, Pete Francis Heimbold, left in 2019.

The band, which is based in the Boston area, was originally active from 1996 until 2002. The members then announced a hiatus, which would ultimately last for almost a decade; during this period, the band came together for reunion concerts in Boston (2004), New York City (2007), and Washington, D.C. (2009). The hiatus ended at the beginning of 2011, when the band announced a national tour. In May of the same year, Dispatch released an EP containing six new songs, their first all-new release since 2000. The band released both their first studio album in over a decade, Circles Around the Sun, and an iTunes session in 2012 and toured North America that summer in support of the album. On April 22, 2013, Dispatch announced a double-disc live album called "Ain't No Trip to Cleveland Vol. 1", released on June 4, 2013. After a long hiatus, Dispatch returned with their new album, America, Location 12, released on June 2, 2017.

== History ==
=== Early years ===
Hermit Thrush and Woodriver Bandits merged into an all-acoustic band in the early 1990s as One Fell Swoop. They soon changed their name to Dispatch after a dispute with another band of the same name. Chad Urmston, Brad Corrigan, and Pete Heimbold, who were all attending Middlebury College, comprised the band's lineup throughout their entire schooling. Their music drew upon several genres, such as acoustic folk-rock, reggae, and funk. They did several concerts in their early years both in and around Middlebury, gaining a name for themselves at the college.

However, even with their Middlebury roots, Dispatch's first show was not near their home campus. They first performed at Cosmic Cantina in Durham, North Carolina, while on a trip to visit the younger sister of one of the band members at Duke University.

=== Mid-1990s–2000s ===
After graduating from college the members of Dispatch relocated to the greater Boston area to continue the strong touring effort that would characterize their sound. Their live show progressed through the years to include extended jams, guest appearances, and mash ups of their songs with other popular artists' songs such as Sublime and often found themselves playing on the jamband circuit. The musicians displayed their versatility at live performances, with each member of the band switching instruments throughout the set. Dispatch gained much recognition outside of New England, without any help from a label, thanks to peer-to-peer file sharing programs such as Napster, as well as word-of-mouth. During their rise to indie fame, they put out four studio albums, which progressed from acoustic albums to full band records with electric guitar. After the release of their last album, Who Are We Living For?, painted and designed by artist William Quigley, they began to tour extensively nationwide. Tensions began to run high between the band members, and they announced an indefinite hiatus in 2002 after a performance on The Late Late Show with Craig Ferguson.

=== Final concert ===
The band eventually scheduled a farewell concert to their fans, in order to get closure on the Dispatch portion of their lives. The free show was performed at the Hatch Shell in Boston on July 31, 2004, and was called "The Last Dispatch". The original prediction of the turnout was between 10,000 and 30,000. Fans flocked from Italy, Portugal, South Africa, Spain, Mexico, New Zealand, and Australia among others, making up an estimated total audience of 166,000. Corrigan told the fans near the end of the performance, "Somebody said, downstairs, that we were shooting for, I don't know, 20,000, 30,000 people would be considered a huge success. And um, we were kind of excited about the idea of trying to get enough of you guys in here that they'd start shutting down Storrow Drive. Well we got our wish." The performance was released as a three-disc set (two CDs, one DVD) later that year, entitled All Points Bulletin, along with recordings from a warm-up show in Somerville, Massachusetts. Special guest appearances at the Somerville performance included Craig Dreyer on saxophone and Brian Sayers on drums. For some of their songs at the Hatch Shell, Dispatch shared the stage with Phil Keaggy (guitar), Paul Tillotson (keyboard), Brian Sayers (drum kit), and Reinaldo DeJesus (percussion).

Dispatch then released a documentary film The Last Dispatch (2005) which chronicles their final twelve days together as a band and tells the story of how they became "the band that redefined independent music history". The film was released and previewed at the Somerville Theatre, the same venue used for the Last Dispatch warm-up shows. Urmston, Corrigan, and Heimbold attended the showing and celebrated throughout the weekend with their fans. The film was released on DVD September 26, 2006.

=== Post-breakup ===
All three of the band's members stayed in the music industry. Urmston became the front man of State Radio, while Corrigan (now credited as Braddigan, a nickname by which he was known since his time with Dispatch) and Heimbold (now credited as Pete Francis, Francis being his middle name) were pursuing solo efforts.

On January 5, 2007, the band announced a benefit concert entitled "Dispatch: Zimbabwe" which reunited the band on July 14, 2007, at Madison Square Garden in New York City. All of the money raised from ticket sales went directly to charities that are fighting disease, famine and social injustice; the vast majority of the funds went to charities in Zimbabwe, though a portion was allocated to local charities that the band supports in the U.S. On January 10, during the first half-hour of the exclusive presale, available to their MySpace friends only, the band announced that the show was "officially sold out". Dispatch quickly scheduled another show for Friday, July 13, 2007. This show sold out within 24 hours, resulting in the addition of yet another night: July 15, 2007. Tickets for this show went on sale January 20 at 9:00 AM on Ticketmaster, which also sold out. The band held multiple charity-ticket auctions for the show through Ticketmaster that raised an additional $20,000+ for The Elias Fund.

Shortly after the announcement of the three Madison Square Garden shows, the band also announced a show at New York City nightclub Webster Hall July 11, 2007. Tickets to the show were available on Ticketmaster through online auction only between June 20 and July 2. The minimum bid for a pair of tickets was $100.

On the day of the concert on July 14, several charity and volunteer events were held in New York City relating to the concerts. Members of the band made appearances at the events, greeting fans and thanking them for coming. At the Madison Square Garden concerts, the band alternated full band performances on the venue's main stage and acoustic numbers on top of their iconic van, Wimpy, in the middle of the arena. They were joined on stage for some songs by various musicians such as the African Children's Choir, Bongo Love (a group from Zimbabwe), and various horn and percussion players. The concert was also split into segments, divided by informational videos on the current state of famine, poverty, and AIDS in Zimbabwe.

Recordings of the concerts were made available in various forms. Hours after each show ended, official audio recordings were sold through SNOCAP on MySpace. A video stream of the July 14 concert in its entirety was also streamed from the band's MySpace for a week. In December 2007, a DVD directed by photographer and filmmaker Danny Clinch, highlighting the weekend will be released in a Collector's Edition, along with a photo book. A regular edition was released on January 29, 2008, which included a DVD of the concert, an audio recording of the concert on CD, a booklet, as well as a dropcard to download additional tracks through a webpage.

Dispatch played an acoustic show at the Kennedy Center in Washington, D.C., on June 12, 2009, at the request of Morgan Tsvangirai, Prime Minister of Zimbabwe. This was another benefit show for Zimbabwe, and the Prime Minister of Zimbabwe was in attendance. The show sold out within ten minutes of going on sale.

=== Dispatch 2011 and reunion ===
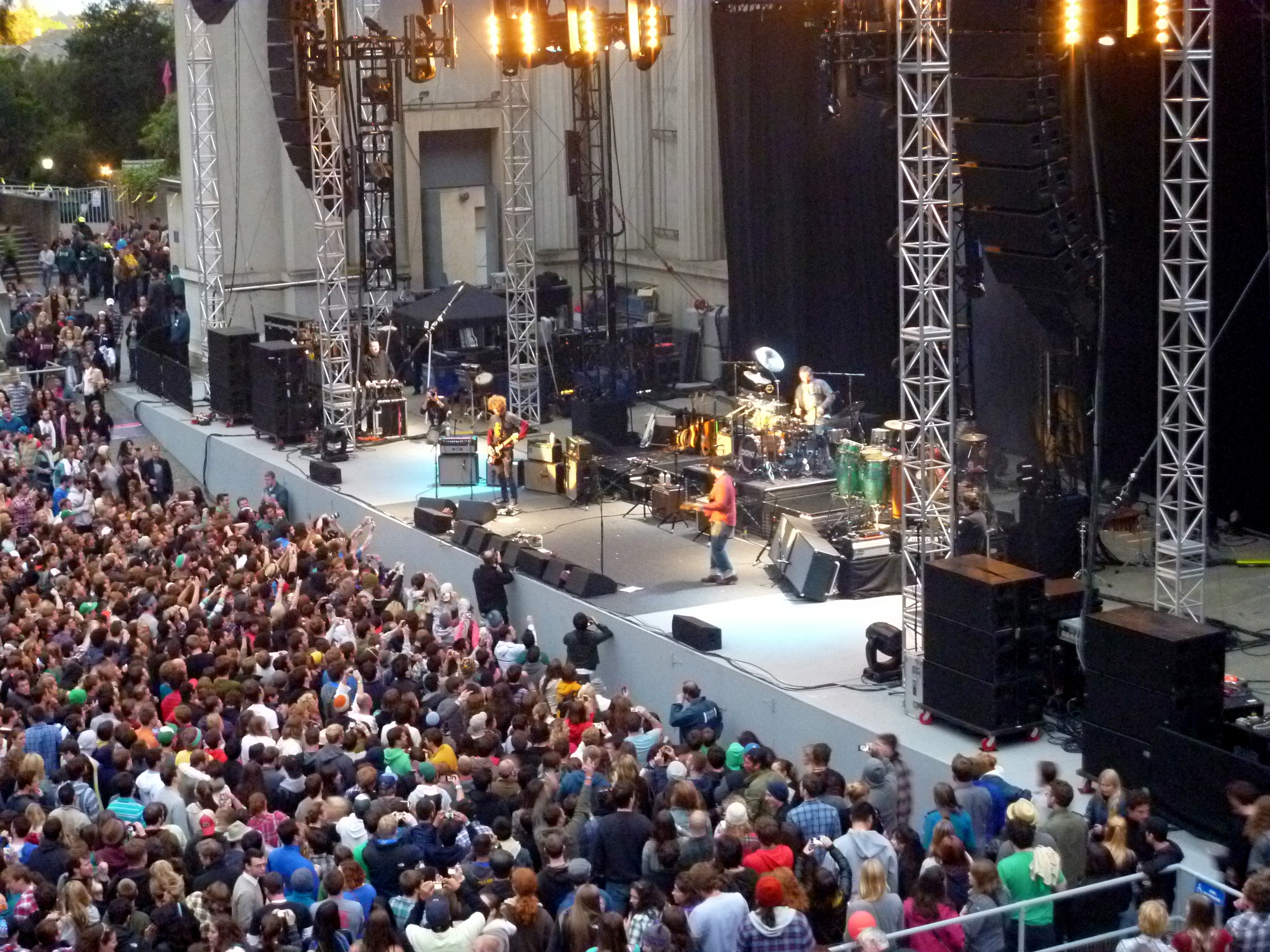
Dispatch at the Greek Theatre, UC Berkeley in 2011

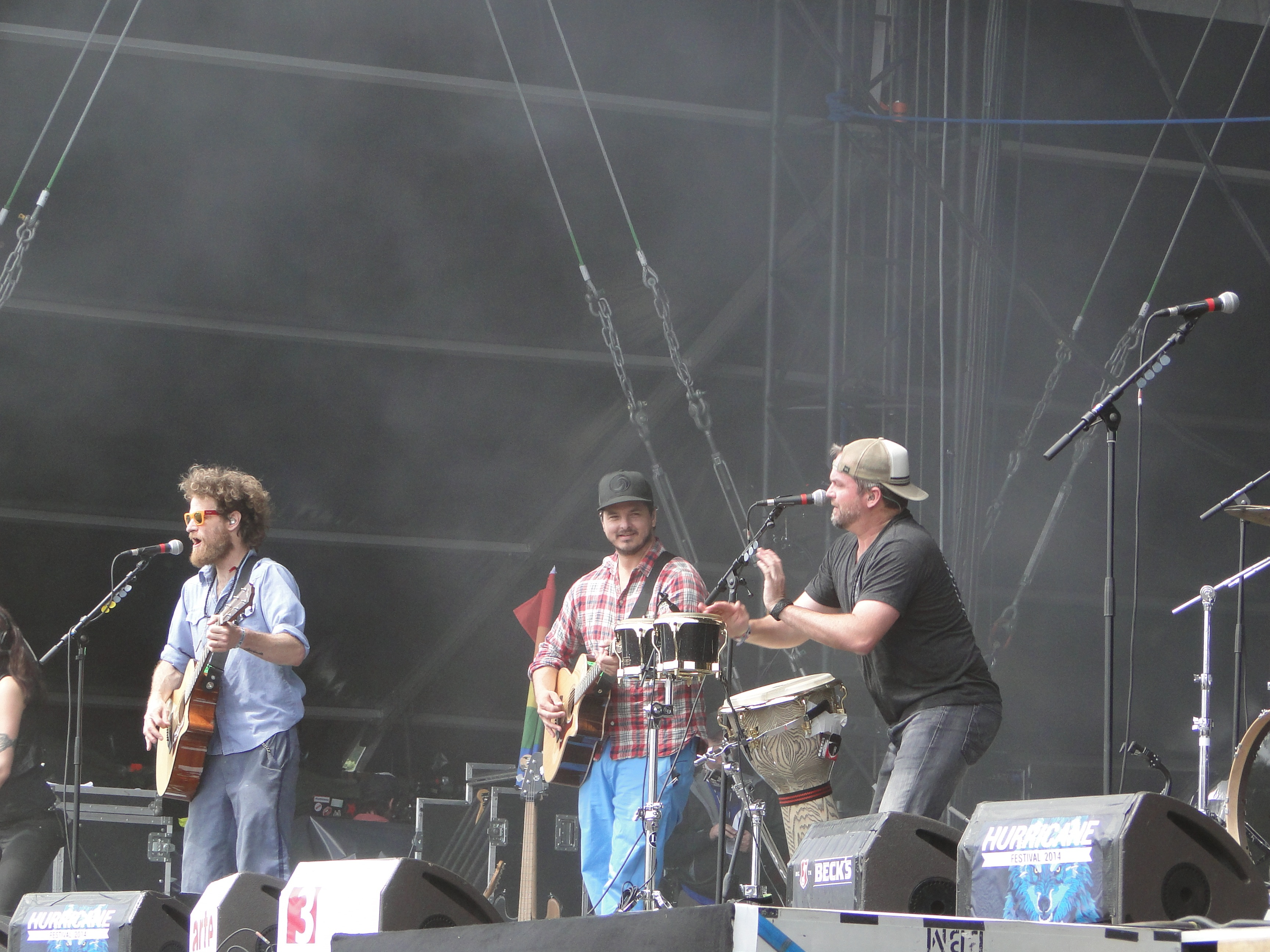
Dispatch at the Hurricane Festival 2014

On November 15, 2010, the Dispatch website was updated with a countdown to the year 2011, with the words "Dispatch 2011" clearly visible in the top right, leading to speculation that one or more reunion concerts would be announced in the coming months. Further adding to speculations of a reunion, on November 22, 2010, Dispatch tweeted an image of a QR code which pointed to a pin on Morrison, Colorado, the home of Red Rocks Amphitheatre, on Google Maps, suggesting that a reunion concert might be played there. Speculation turned to the idea of a possible tour when more QR codes were released on each of the five subsequent Mondays, pointing to pins on Chicago, Illinois; Berkeley, California; Boston, Massachusetts; Atlanta, Georgia; and Harrison, New Jersey.

On January 1, 2011, Dispatch officially announced that they would mount a reunion tour the following June. Additionally, the band announced that "a portion of all ticket proceeds will go towards education programs in local communities."

They also decided to join Dave Matthews Band as well as several other prominent bands and performers on two stops of the DMB CARAVAN. They were slated to perform at Governors Island in New York on Saturday, August 27 and the Gorge, in George, WA on Sunday, September 4. The second two days (Saturday, August 27 and Sunday, August 28) of the Governor's Island caravan stop were canceled due to Hurricane Irene, and Dispatch agreed to play the rescheduled Caravan on Randall's Island, also in New York. They agreed to two shows, on Friday, September 16 and Saturday, September 17.

Throughout the rest of the winter, Dispatch released short clips of themselves rehearsing new songs, as well as photos of themselves in a studio, fueling suspicion that a new album or EP would accompany the tour. On April 5, 2011, Dispatch released a short video via YouTube confirming that they were in the process of recording a new EP.

On Wednesday, April 27, 2011, Dispatch performed the song "Melon Bend" on Late Night with Jimmy Fallon, to be released on their upcoming "Dispatch EP".

On Tuesday, May 10, 2011, Dispatch confirmed via their YouTube channel that their new EP would be released on May 17, 2011. Along with the news, Dispatch also released a sample of their song "Valentine", which appeared on the EP.

On May 17, 2011, Dispatch released their new EP. Within hours of its release, it shot to No. 2 in the iTunes albums chart. On November 28, 2011, Dispatch announced their first UK/EU tour. In 2012, Dispatch released their first full-length studio album in over a decade, called Circles Around the Sun. On April 2, 2012, Dispatch announced a North American tour in support of the release.

On April 22, 2013, the band announced the release of a double-disc live album called Ain't No Trip to Cleveland Vol. 1. The album consists of versions of songs performed at shows during their 2012 tour. It was released on June 4, 2013. Dispatch played a number of dates in the summer of 2013. On September 2, 2014, Dispatch announced via an email newsletter that they had begun production of their sixth full-length studio album.

On January 1, 2015, Dispatch announced that they would be playing a benefit show on July 11, 2015, at Madison Square Garden in New York City to shine light on the issue of hunger in America. DISPATCH:HUNGER is set to be the only show in North America in 2015, and $1 from every ticket sold will go directly to starving Americans. John Butler Trio is slated to guest at the benefit concert.

Due to increased demand, on January 20, 2015, Dispatch announced that they would be adding a second night to their DISPATCH:HUNGER show on July 10, 2015, at Madison Square Garden.

Dispatch announced on their website on April 5, 2016, that they would be playing in Germany and Austria that July.

On February 10, 2017, Dispatch announced on their website that they would be touring the United States in June and July, and would be joined by Guster for most of their shows. In the same announcement, the band released a new song, "Only The Wild Ones" from their upcoming album, entitled America, Location 12, released on June 2, 2017. The band went on tour following the release of their new album, with shows throughout the US and Europe.

In 2018, Dispatch announced another summer tour and a new "album project" titled Location 13. The band began releasing songs every couple of weeks throughout the summer, culminating in a release in late 2018. The first single, Cross the World, tracks the band's history from formation through the present.

On February 25, 2021, Dispatch announced that their eighth studio album, titled Break Our Fall, would be released on May 28, 2021. In December of that year, they announced a tour, co-headlined by O.A.R., that would last from July through September, 2022 and consist of 37 performances. In October, 2024 they embarked on the "Amplifying Democracy" tour, including several stops in main battleground states before the 2024 election in an effort to encourage voter registration and participation. These shows also included the announcement of a new album and a preview of some of the songs, coming in early 2025

== Musical style ==
Dispatch experiments with a variety of genres, and thus is known as a very difficult band to categorize. Different styles and idioms employed by the band include reggae, flamenco, funk, ska, folk, rock, and rap.

== Members ==
- Chad "Chetro" Urmston
  - Instruments: vocals, guitar, bass, percussion, trombone, and piano
- Brad "Braddigan" Corrigan
  - Instruments: vocals, drums, percussion, guitar, and harmonica

=== Former members ===
- Pete "Repete" Francis Heimbold
  - Instruments: vocals, bass, and guitar

=== Regular participating musicians ===
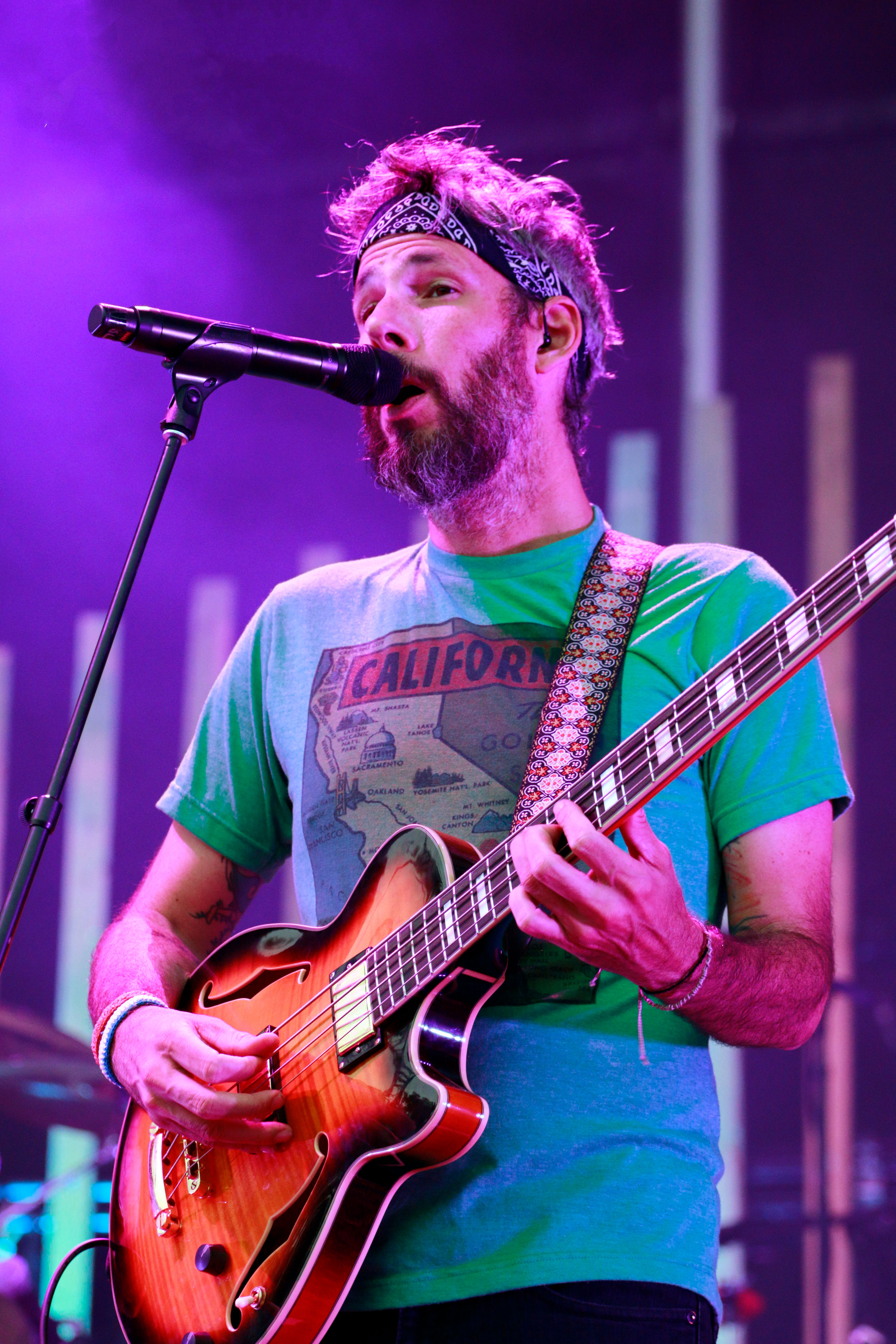
Matthew Embree plays bass guitar during Dispatch Location 12 Tour in NYC

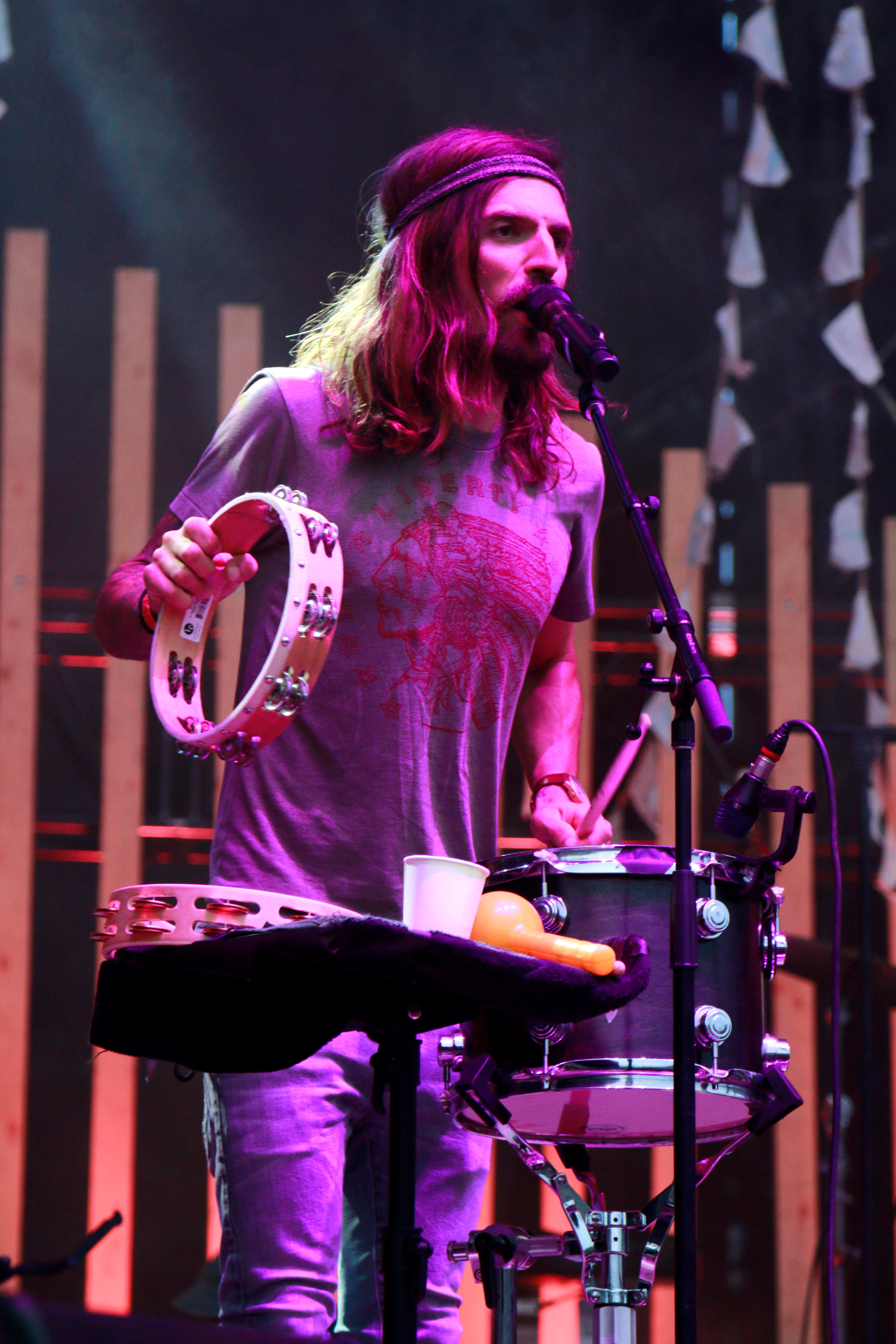
Jon "J.R." Reilly plays percussion during Dispatch Location 12 Tour

- Matthew Embree
  - Instruments: backing vocals, guitar, bass
- Jon "J.R." Reilly
  - Instruments: backing vocals, drums, percussion, congas, bongos, cymbals, and tambourine
- Mike Sawitzke
  - Instruments: backing vocals, guitar, banjo, trumpet, mandolin, and keyboard

== Discography ==
=== Studio albums ===
- 1996: Silent Steeples – Bomber, Foundations, DCN
- 1997: Bang Bang – Bomber, Foundations, Universal Records
- 1999: Four-Day Trials – Bomber, Foundations, Universal Records
- 2000: Who Are We Living For? – Bomber, Foundations, Universal Records
- 2012: Circles Around the Sun – Bomber, Foundations, Universal Records
- 2017: America, Location 12 – Bomber, Foundations, Universal Records
- 2018: Location 13 – Bomber, Foundations, Universal Records
- 2021: Break Our Fall – Bomber, Foundations, Universal Records
- 2025: Yellow Jacket – Bomber

=== EPs ===
- 2011: Dispatch EP US No. 42 – Bomber, Foundations, Universal Records
- 2012: iTunes Session

=== Live albums ===
- 2001: Gut the Van – DCN, Universal Records
- 2004: All Points Bulletin
- 2007: Zimbabwe
- 2013: Ain't No Trip to Cleveland Vol. 1
- 2019: Live 18
- 2023: Live from the Boston Woods

=== DVDs ===
- 2002: Under the Radar – DCN, Universal Records
- 2005: The Last Dispatch – Fabrication Films
- 2007: Dispatch: Zimbabwe – Live at Madison Square Garden
- 2012: Dispatch: Live from Red Bull Arena

=== Compilation albums ===
- 2005: The Relief Project: Vol. I by various artists (as part of The Relief Project)

=== Singles ===
Title	Year	Peak chart positions	Album
Title	Year	US AAA	Album
"Bound by Love"	2015	—	Non-album single
"Only the Wild Ones"	2017	9	America, Location 12
"Skin the Rabbit (Edit)"	2017	—	America, Location 12
"Painted Yellow Lines"	2017	15	America, Location 12
"Father Christmas"	2017	—	Non-album single
"Midnight Lorry"	2018	32	America, Location 12
"Dear Congress, (17)"	2018	—	Location 13
"May We All"	2021	25	Break Our Fall
"—" denotes single that did not chart or was not released in that territory.

== Elias Fund ==
The story behind the song "Elias" written by Chad Urmston about his experience living and teaching in Zimbabwe inspired the nonprofit organization the Elias Fund to form in 2005. The Elias Fund looks to provide hope and opportunity to Zimbabwean youth through community development and education while empowering the American youth culture to embrace their global role and make it an active one.

== The Relief Project ==
On December 22, 2005, Corrigan helped to organize a benefit concert, known as The Relief Project, at Irving Plaza in New York City. Along with several other performers, Corrigan invited Heimbold and State Radio to play. The three reunited very briefly, playing the song "Here We Go" as an encore. Corrigan stated there that he plans further Relief Project concerts featuring all three.

The Dispatch Foundation

In 2007 The Dispatch Foundation was created following the Dispatch Madison Square Garden Reunion benefit concerts. The organization works to address the deep-seated social and economic problems plaguing Zimbabwe such as inflation, starvation, unemployment and HIV/AIDS.
