= Zimbabwe (Dispatch album) =

Live album by Dispatch
- Released: 2007
- Recorded: July 2007
- Genre: Rock
- Label: Universal
- Producer: Dispatch

Dispatch chronology
All Points Bulletin (2004)	Zimbabwe (2007)	Dispatch EP (2011)

Zimbabwe is a 2007 live album by American indie/roots folk band Dispatch. The album was recorded in Madison Square Garden in front of a sellout crowd.

== Track listing ==
13.07.07

1. "Here We Go"
2. "Passerby"
3. "Bats In The Belfry"
4. "Cover This"
5. "Lightning"
6. "Ride a Tear"
7. "Past the Falls"
8. "Fallin'"
9. "Bang Bang"
10. "Prince of Spades"
11. "Carry You"
12. "Cut It Match It"
13. "Flying Horses"
14. "Time Served"
15. "Even"
16. "Open Up"
17. "Camilo"
18. "Out Loud"
19. "The General"
20. "Elias"
21. "Two Coins"
22. "Mission"

14.07.07

1. "Here We Go"
2. "Time Served"
3. "What Do You Want to Be"
4. "Open Up"
5. "Riddle"
6. "Bullet Holes"
7. "Bang Bang"
8. "Ride a Tear"
9. "Passerby"
10. "Cover This"
11. "Mission"
12. "Questioned Apocalypse"
13. "Walk With You"
14. "Two Coins"
15. "Flying Horses"
16. "Past the Falls"
17. "Fallin'"
18. "Carry You"
19. "Lightning"
20. "Prince of Spades"
21. "Out Loud"
22. "Bats in the Belfry"
23. "Elias"
24. "Cut It Match It"
25. "The General"

15.07.07

1. "Here We Go"
2. "Open Up"
3. "Bang Bang"
4. "Riddle"
5. "Ride a Tear"
6. "Lightning"
7. "Mission"
8. "Prince of Spades"
9. "Carnival"
10. "Cover This"
11. "Passerby"
12. "Fallin'"
13. "Bridges"
14. "Steeples"
15. "Walk With You"
16. "Flying Horses"
17. "Time Served"
18. "Even"
19. "Mayday"
20. "Past the Falls"
21. "Customs"
22. "Elias"
23. "Two Coins"
24. "Cut It Ya Match It"
25. "Bats in the Belfry"
26. "Out Loud"
27. "The General"
