= Dispatch (EP) =

Dispatch EP

EP by Dispatch
- Released: May 17, 2011
- Recorded: 2011
- Genre: Rock
- Length: 25:21
- Label: Bomber Records
- Producer: Peter Katis

Dispatch chronology
| Zimbabwe (2007) | Dispatch EP (2011) | Circles Around the Sun (2012) |

Dispatch EP is an EP that was released by Dispatch on May 17, 2011. It is the band's first studio record in over ten years and was followed by the full-length album Circles Around the Sun in 2012. Upon its release, the EP shot to #2 on the iTunes album charts. The track Melon Bend has been released for free download via the band's website and was performed live on Late Night with Jimmy Fallon on April 27, 2011.

== Track listing ==
1. "Melon Bend" - 4:24
2. "Con Man" - 4:08
3. "Valentine" - 3:33
4. "Beto" - 4:41
5. "Broken American" - 4:31
6. "Turn This Ship Around" - 4:04

== Personnel ==
- Brad "Braddigan" Corrigan - vocals, drums, percussion, guitar, ukulele & harmonica
- Chad "Chetro" Stokes - vocals, guitar, keyboards, percussion & bass
- Pete "Repete" Heimbold - vocals, bass & guitar
- Boo Reiners - banjo
- Paul Stivitts - drums
- Reinaldo de Jesús - percussion
