= Waterstop =

A waterstop is an element of a concrete structure, intended to prevent the passages of fluids (such as water) when embedded in and running continuously through concrete joints. Waterstops are grouped in two distinct categories. Waterstops for joints without any movement of the adjoint concrete sections (construction cold joints) and waterstops for joints with movement of the adjoint concrete sections (dilation joints).

== Types ==
Waterstops are manufactured from a variety of materials depending on their functionality and intended use. The most common types are:

- Waterstops made from extruded plastics such as flexible polyvinyl chloride PVC, polyethylene (PE) or thermoplastic vulcanized rubber (TPV); formed metal such as stainless steel, copper, or carbon steel - with or without polymeric coatings; extruded thermosets such as natural rubber, styrene-butadiene rubber, or neoprene rubber.
- Hydrophobic Polymer waterstops such as PVC, PE, TPV, or rubber are supplied to the construction site in coils (usually 25 m long), and are generally anywhere from 120 mm to 320 mm wide in a variety of profiles that are designed to simultaneously provide an interlock with the concrete they are installed in and to provide for a limited amount of movement within the joint. PVC, PE and TPV waterstops are made continuous for the length of the concrete joint by heat welding, using simple thermoplastic welding equipment. PE and TPV waterstops are generally installed in joints of secondary containment structures to prevent the passage of hazardous fluids other than water such as fuel oils, acids, or process chemicals. The German national standards DIN 18541 and DIN 7865 regulate dimensions and material properties of polymeric waterstops.
- Metal waterstops are delivered in coils of up to 50 m with a typical dimension of 1.0 to 1.5 mm thickness and width of 250 to 300 mm. Splices can be welded, overlapped or joined with a sealant. A subcategory of metal waterstops is coated with polymeric and/or hydrophilic materials in order to provide a higher bond to the concrete and form a secondary barrier against waterseapage. These waterstops come in 25 m coils or in 2.0 - 2.5 m sections. Multi-purpose customized waterstops may also function as shuttering or crack-inducer for cold joints.
- Hydrophilic or "water-loving" waterstops are strips of rubber, modified with a hydrophilic agent (such as bentonite) so they swell in the presence of moisture to effectively seal concrete construction joints. Hydrophilic strip applied waterstops should not be used in contraction or expansion joints per the instructions of most commercial manufacturers. Hydrophilic waterstops can only be effective if they are allowed to swell; therefore, water must be present to activate the hydrophilic agent. Initial leaking is possible until the waterstop expands to seal the joint. The American Concrete Institute recommends against the use of hydrophilic waterstops for hazardous fluids such as fuels, acids, and process chemicals, as the products may not swell as intended in fluids other than water. Hydrophilic waterstops are also available as moulded plugs and rings to create a seal around formwork spacers, center pens and tie rods.
