= Bang Bang (Dispatch album) =

Studio album by Dispatch
- Released: September 1, 1997; October 26, 2004 (Reissue)
- Recorded: June – July 1997; West Greenwich, Rhode Island; May 1996 ("The Way It Goes" and "Out Loud"); Middlebury College, Middlebury, Vermont
- Genre: Jam band
- Length: 50:14
- Label: Bomber, Foundations, Universal
- Producer: Dispatch

Dispatch chronology
Silent Steeples (1996)	Bang Bang (1997)	Four-Day Trials (1999)

Professional ratings
Review scores
Source	Rating
Allmusic	4.5/5 stars

Bang Bang is a 1997 album by American indie/roots rock band Dispatch. It is their second album, following Silent Steeples.

== Track listing ==
All lyrics are written by Chad Urmston except as noted; all music is composed by Dispatch.

No.	Title	Lyrics	Length
1.	"Here We Go"		4:41
2.	"Bats in the Belfry"		4:09
3.	"The General"		4:07
4.	"Bang Bang"		4:28
5.	"Mission"	Pete Heimbold, Chad Urmston, Brad Corrigan	4:07
6.	"Drive"	Pete Heimbold	2:59
7.	"Two Coins"	Pete Heimbold	3:07
8.	"Railway" (listed as "Railway Station" in the lyrics)	Chad Urmston, Pete Heimbold	4:08
9.	"Whirlwind"	Brad Corrigan	4:56
10.	"Out Loud"		3:32

2004 Remaster
No.	Title	Length
11.	"The Way It Goes"	4:24
12.	"Bats In The Belfry" (acoustic)	5:36

== Credits ==
- Chad Urmston - vocals, guitar, trombone, bass, percussion
- Pete Heimbold - vocals, bass, guitar
- Brad Corrigan - vocals, drums, percussion, guitar, harmonica
- Geoff Burke - sax
- Tom Urmston, Stu Salyer, Weej Mudge, Ben Urmston, Willy Urmston (The Belfry Chorus)
