= Somerville Theatre =

Independent movie theater and concert venue in Somerville, Massachusetts

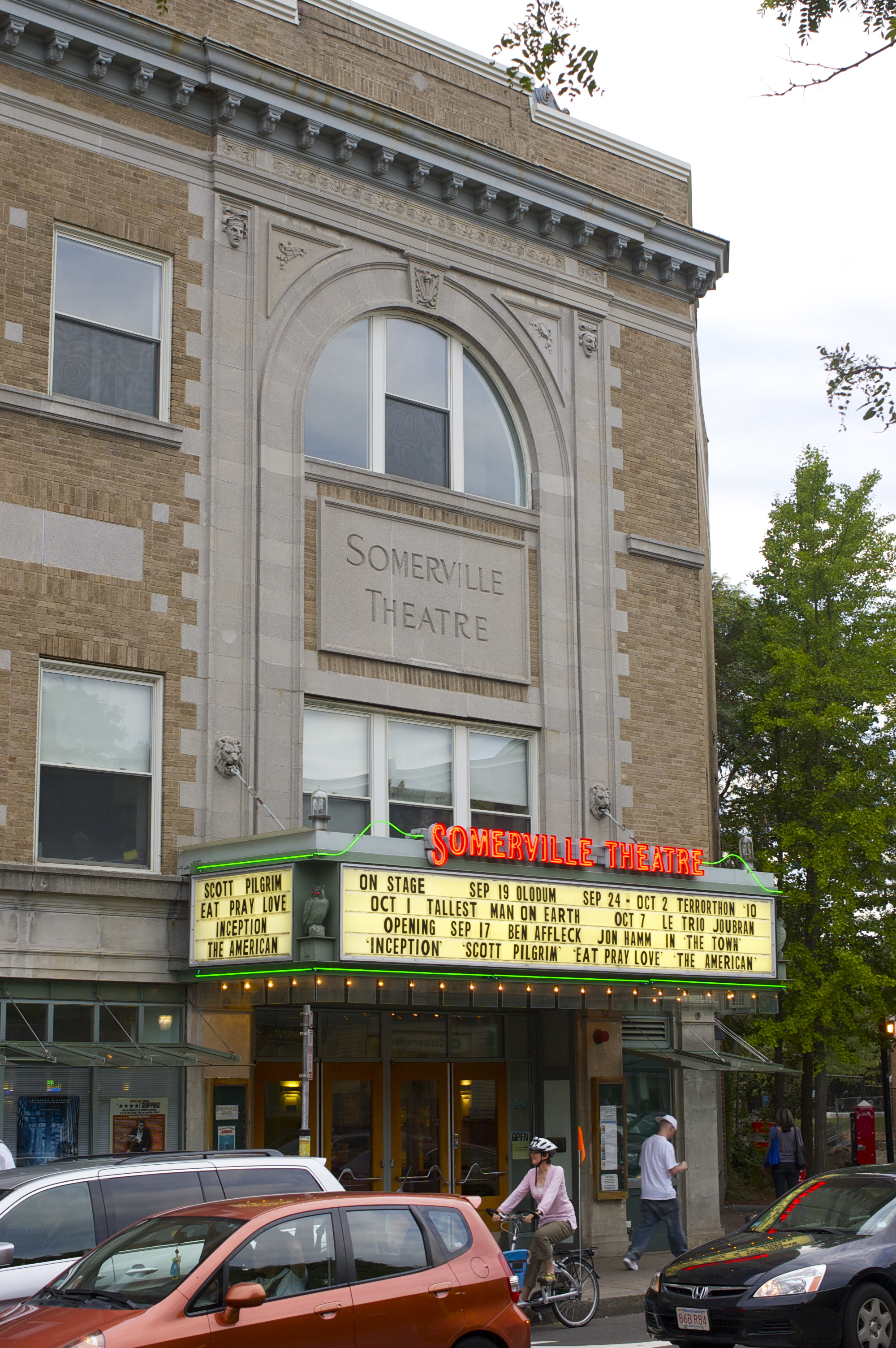
- Interactive map of Somerville Theatre
- Address: 55 Davis Square; Somerville, Massachusetts; United States
- Owner: FEI Theatres / Frame One Theatres
- Capacity: 900 / 92 / 31 / 150 / 145 / 92
- Current use: cinema, and live music, comedy and dance venue

Construction
- Opened: 1914
- Architects: Funk & Wilcox

Website
- somervilletheatre.com
- Somerville Theater/Hobbs Building
- U.S. National Register of Historic Places
- Location within Massachusetts Location within the United States
- Coordinates: 42°23′48.3463″N 71°7′22.3645″W
- Built: 1914
- Architectural style: Art Deco
- MPS: Somerville MRA
- NRHP reference No.: 89002330
- Added to NRHP: 1990

The Somerville Theatre is an independent movie theater and concert venue in the Davis Square neighborhood of Somerville, Massachusetts, United States. More than 100 years old, the Somerville Theatre started off as a vaudeville house and movie theater. The theater has since transitioned and now operates as a live music venue and first-run movie theater. As a music venue, the theater has played host to many historic concerts, including the first of the two Last Dispatch concerts, two shows by Bruce Springsteen in 2003, and a performance by U2 in 2009. Recent live performances have included Ryan Adams & the Cardinals, Cursive, Norah Jones, The Jonas Brothers, Joan Baez, and the John Butler Trio.

The building also hosts the Crystal Ballroom.

== Early years ==
The Somerville Theater is part of the Hobbs Building which was built in 1914 by Joseph Hobbs and designed by the firm of Funk & Wilcox of Boston. Designed for stage shows, vaudeville, opera, and motion pictures, the theater was only one of the highlights of the Hobbs Building, which also contained a basement café, basement bowling alley and billiards hall, the theater lobbies and ten storefronts on the ground floor, and the Hobbs Crystal Ballroom, a 700-person dance hall, on the second floor. The second and third floors also contained office space for lease. In 1915, the Somerville Theater Players began their stock company presentation of weekly play performances. Among the notable players who came up at the Somerville were Tallulah Bankhead, Kay Corbett, and Francis X. Bushman. Future film director Busby Berkeley (famous for 42nd Street and other stylized musicals of the 1930s) directed many shows at the Somerville Theatre in the mid-1920s.

== The movie era ==
In 1926, the Hobbs family leased and subsequently sold the theater to Arthur F. Viano, whose family built and owned other area theaters such as the Teele Square Theater, the Broadway Theater in East Somerville, and the Regent Theater in Arlington. The Vianos continued with the stock theater company until the harsh economics of the Depression forced them into a 'movies only' policy in 1932. Throughout the 30s, 40s, 50s and 60s, the Somerville remained a prime neighborhood movie house. In those days, new films would open at the downtown theaters like the RKO Keiths (now the Boston Opera House), the Paramount, the Metropolitan (now the Citi Performing Arts Center) and the Loew's Orpheum (now a concert hall). After playing downtown, the pictures made their way, week by week, often two and three per week, to the neighborhood houses like the Somerville Theatre. Like all Viano Theaters, the Somerville was well known for fresh popcorn, and also for gimmicks like prize nights. These gift nights began in the depression and lasted at the Somerville until the 1970s. These were certain nights, usually weekdays, where dishware, appliances, and other merchandise was given away to entice patrons to attend the show. Gradually the Viano family came to operate the Capitol Theater in Arlington as well, and by the 1970s, the Somerville, Capitol, Regent, and Broadway theaters were mainstays of local movie-going. The opening of the Sacks Assembly Square Cinema (now closed) helped to kill the Broadway Theater, and the Fresh Pond Drive-In became a multiplex, forcing the Cambridge-Somerville-Arlington neighborhood theaters to become strictly second-run venues.

== Repertory house ==
The Viano family leased the Somerville to Garen Daly in 1982. He turned the theater into a repertory house, running double features and daily changes. The theater offered independent and offbeat fare in the days before video and DVD made it easy to track down such titles. Daly also brought back live performances to the stage for the first time since the 1930s when he began programming concerts to complement the film programs.

During this period, the Hobbs Building was purchased by Chatham Light Realty, whose owners, the Fraiman family, had previously bought and operated the Capitol Theater in Arlington. When Garen Daly's lease ended in 1989, the Fraimans decided to operate the Somerville themselves, closing the venue for a series of renovations. The theater reopened in 1990.

== Renovation and restoration ==
After renovations were completed, the theater reopened, but saw a significant drop in movie attendance. The majority of the Hobbs building had been abandoned since the early 1980s, so in 1996, a round of extensive renovations began.

The bowling alleys in the basement and a portion of the first floor retail space were gutted to create modern bathrooms and two new film rooms. Two more screens were built in the former ballroom space on the second floor. An elevator was installed, new windows and a marquee reminiscent of the original were added, and the third and second floors became new modern office space. The theater lobby was expanded by taking over an adjacent storefront, and new seats were installed in the orchestra seating of the original auditorium.

In 2006, further renovations restored the original auditorium interior to a more historically accurate theme and color scheme while upgrades to the stage like new curtains, rigging, and movie screen were also completed.

In 2008, the second gallery of the Museum of Bad Art opened in the basement of the theater. The gallery was placed near both the women's and men's restrooms, similar to the museum's first gallery location in the Dedham Community Theater. Although the original gallery is free and open to the public, the gallery here is only free with admission to the theater. The gallery closed in 2019.

In 2009, renovations included new balcony seating, replacing the original seats from 1914; the installation of Dolby Digital Sound and 24 surround speakers throughout the original auditorium; and a revamped projection booth, containing two Norelco DP-70 projectors. The Somerville is now one of the few theaters in New England, and one of only two in Metro Boston (the other being the Coolidge Corner Theatre), that can run 70mm film. The Theatre currently operates as a three-screen cinema.

During the closure of the theater due to the COVID-19 Pandemic, screens 4 and 5 were restored into the Crystal Ballroom, a live-music venue and function hall.

== Today ==
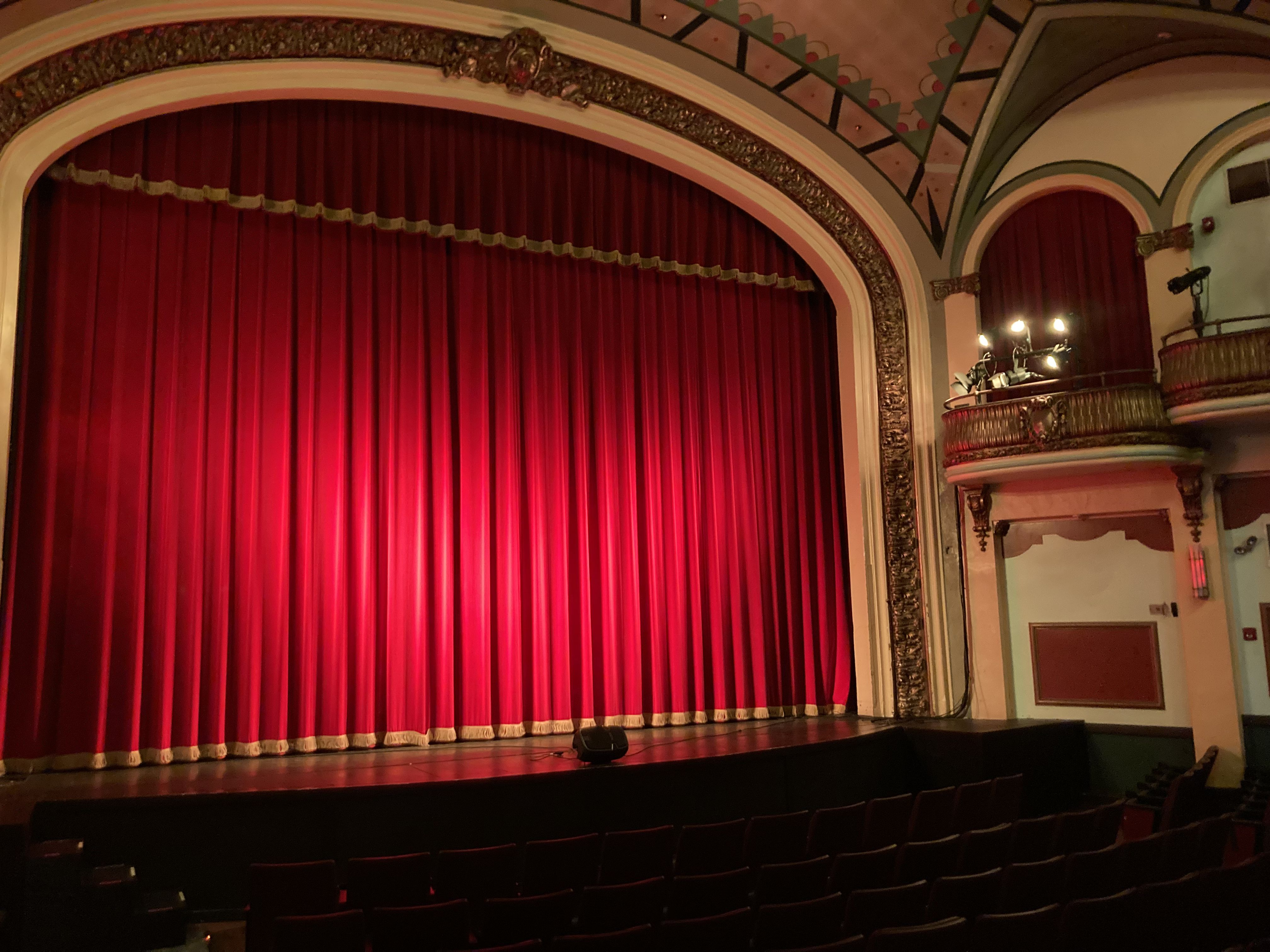
Interior of main theater

The Fraiman family, (then operating as Fraiman Enterprises Inc. - now Frame One Theatres), took ownership of the Somerville Theatre in 1990 and has since made multiple changes to keep up with the evolving movie theater industry. Since 1990, 4 screens have been added and digital projectors have been installed, although two screens on the upper level have been restored into a ballroom which formerly occupied the space. The Theatre currently operates as a three-screen cinema. Home to one of the most technically advanced projection booths on the east coast, the Somerville can present virtually any film format - from digital releases to archival 35mm and 70mm film prints. The Somerville also counts a rentable 31-seat "microcinema" among its screening rooms. All screens (except the microcinema) are equipped with 35mm projectors and DCP. Only screen 1 is capable of 70mm.

The theatre currently operates as a first- and second-run moviehouse, with an emphasis on independent and art house fare. It also regularly hosts live music, dance and comedy performances, with entertainers including U2, Louis CK, Jonathan Richman, Thomas Dolby, and Arlo Guthrie on its stage.

The theatre regularly runs vintage 35mm and 70mm films, silent films with live musical accompaniment, and as of 2016, hosts a yearly "The 70mm and Widescreen Film Festival" in September. It is also the main host theatre for the Independent Film Festival of Boston and The Slutcracker.

The Somerville Theatre is in the minority in the movie theater industry for being locally owned and independent but also operating as a for profit company.

In 2025, the Fraiman family transferred operation of the theater to CSB Theatres, Inc., a company formed by longtime employees of the theater. In July 2026, the Fraimans put the Hobbs Building up for sale with a $12 million asking price, and in October 2026, CSB Theatres purchased the entire building to secure the theater's permanent future.

== In popular culture ==
Bobby "Boris" Pickett grew up working at the theater. His father was the manager. The movies he watched at the Somerville inspired him to write the song Monster Mash.

In the movie Ted, the scene featuring the premiere of Star Wars: Episode I – The Phantom Menace was filmed at the Somerville Theatre.

The theater's balcony and lobby are featured in Alexander Payne's 2023 film The Holdovers.

== Gallery ==
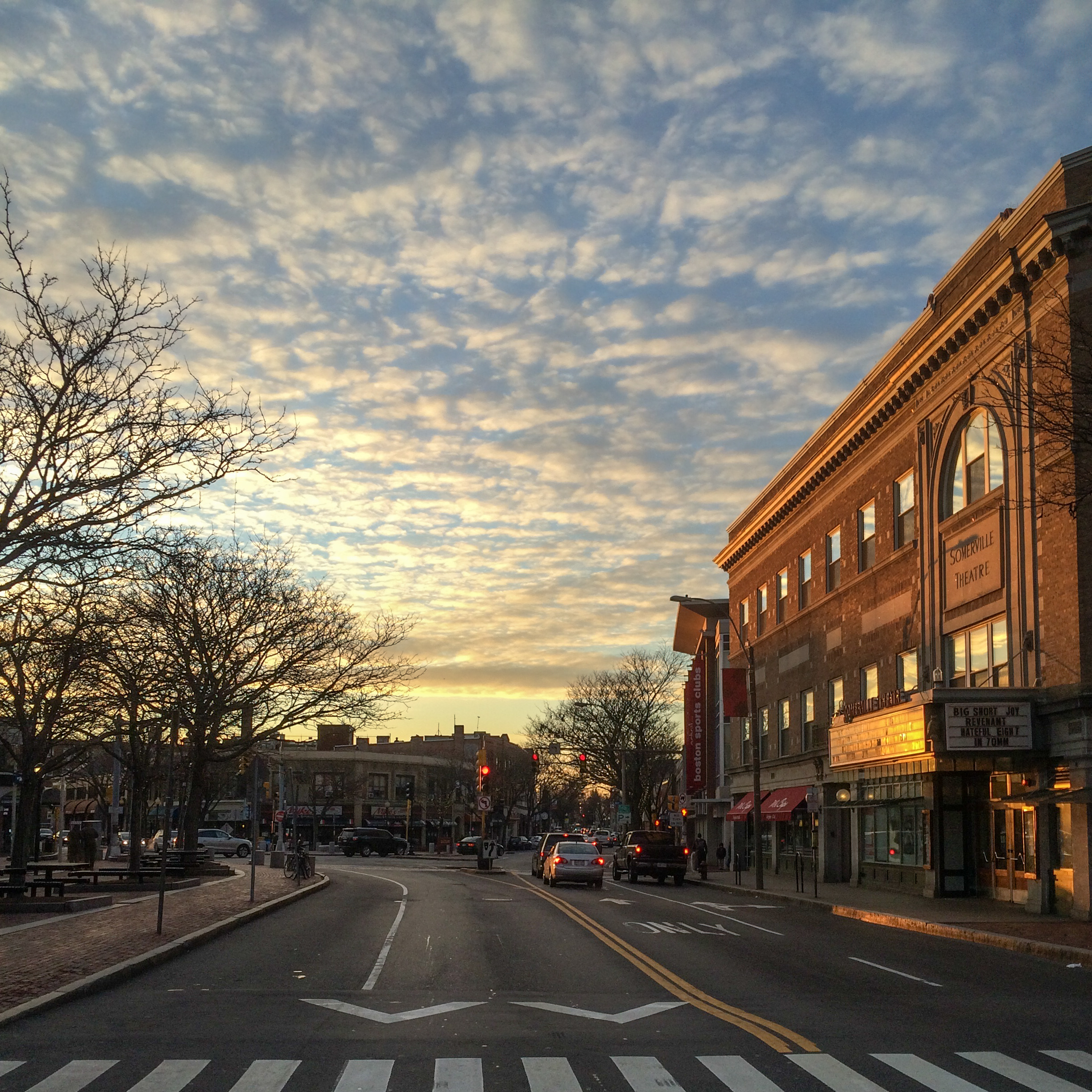
Elm Street at sunrise, theatre visible on the right

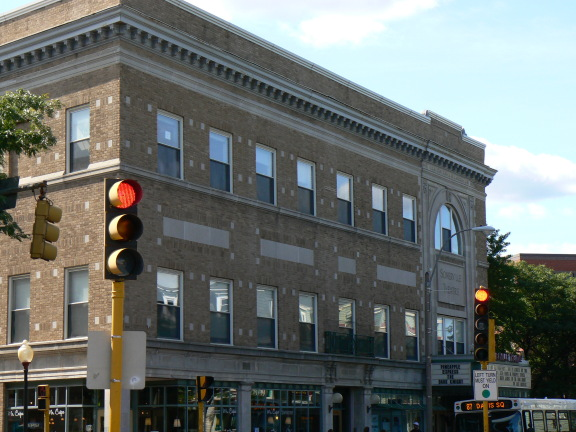
The Hobbs Building, with the theatre entrance at the right

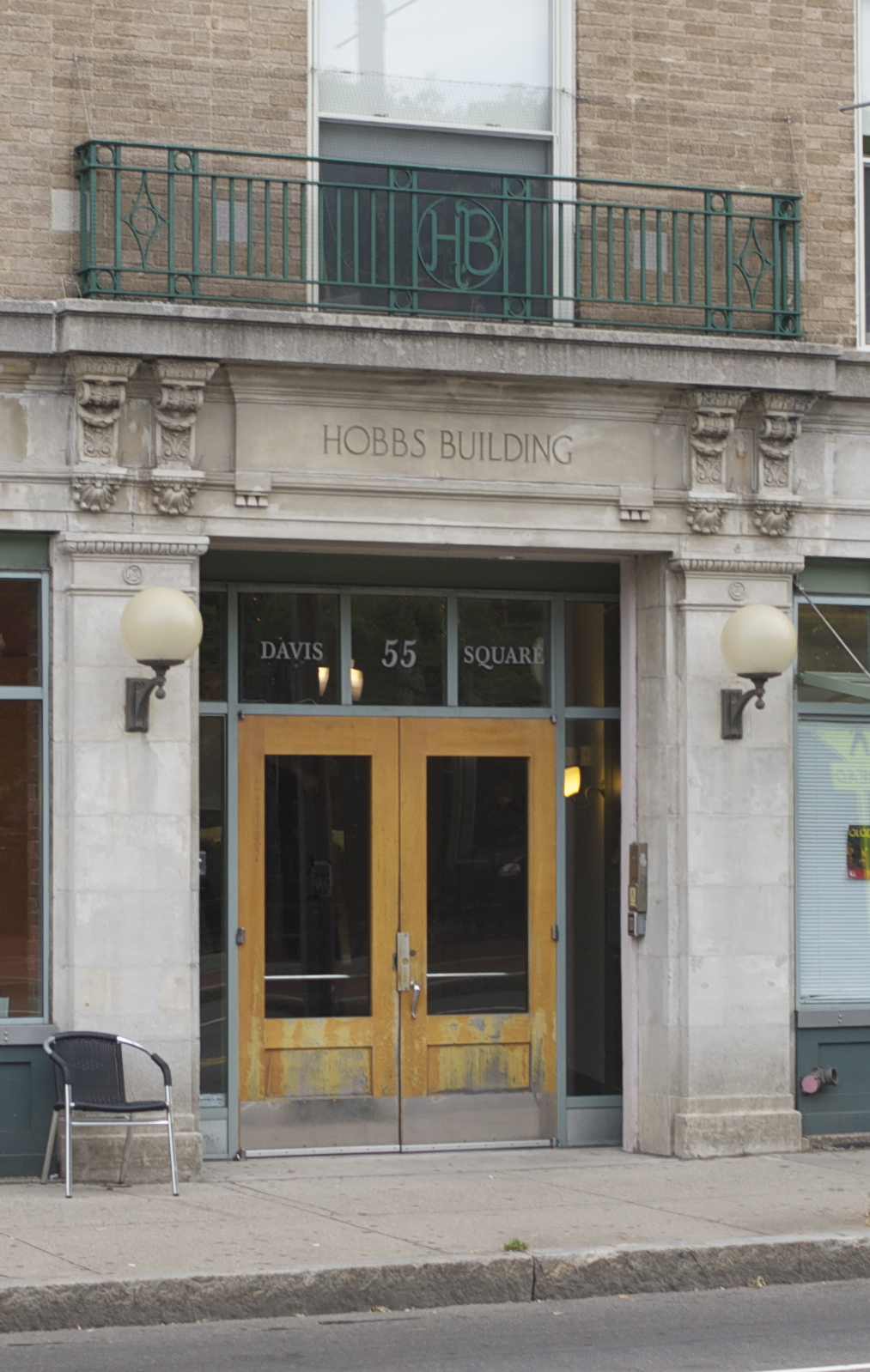
The entrance to the Hobbs Building at 55 Davis Square

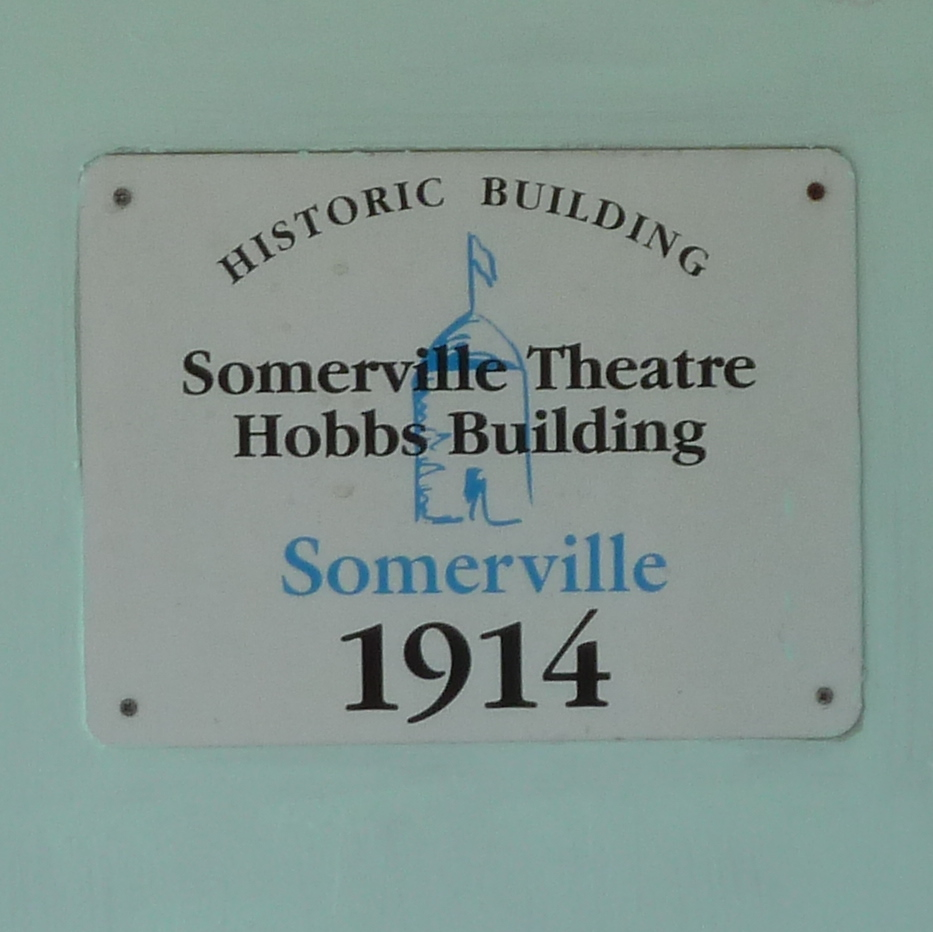
The historical marker sign on the face of the Somerville Theatre Hobbs Building

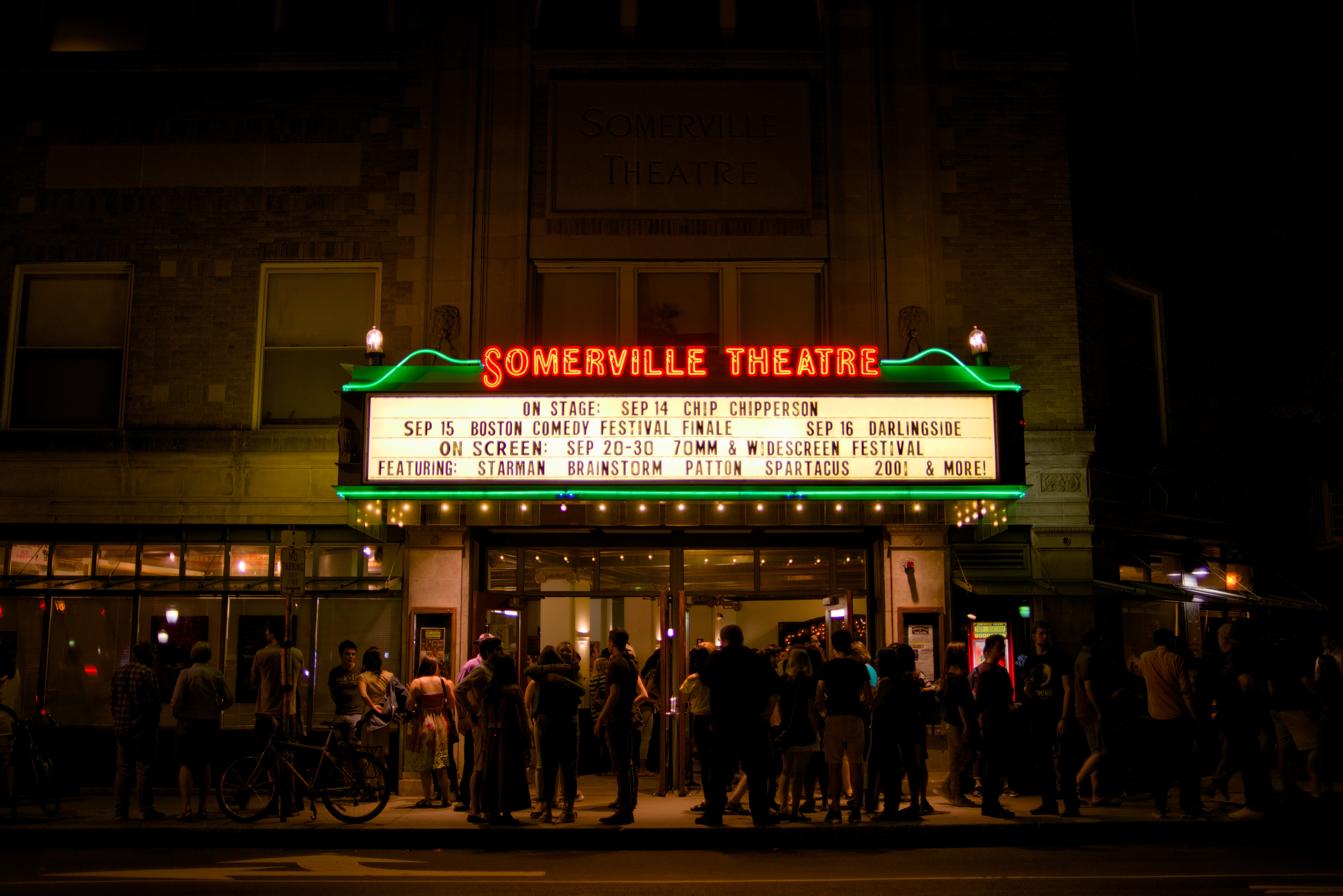
Following the end of a film showing, audience are exiting the theatre

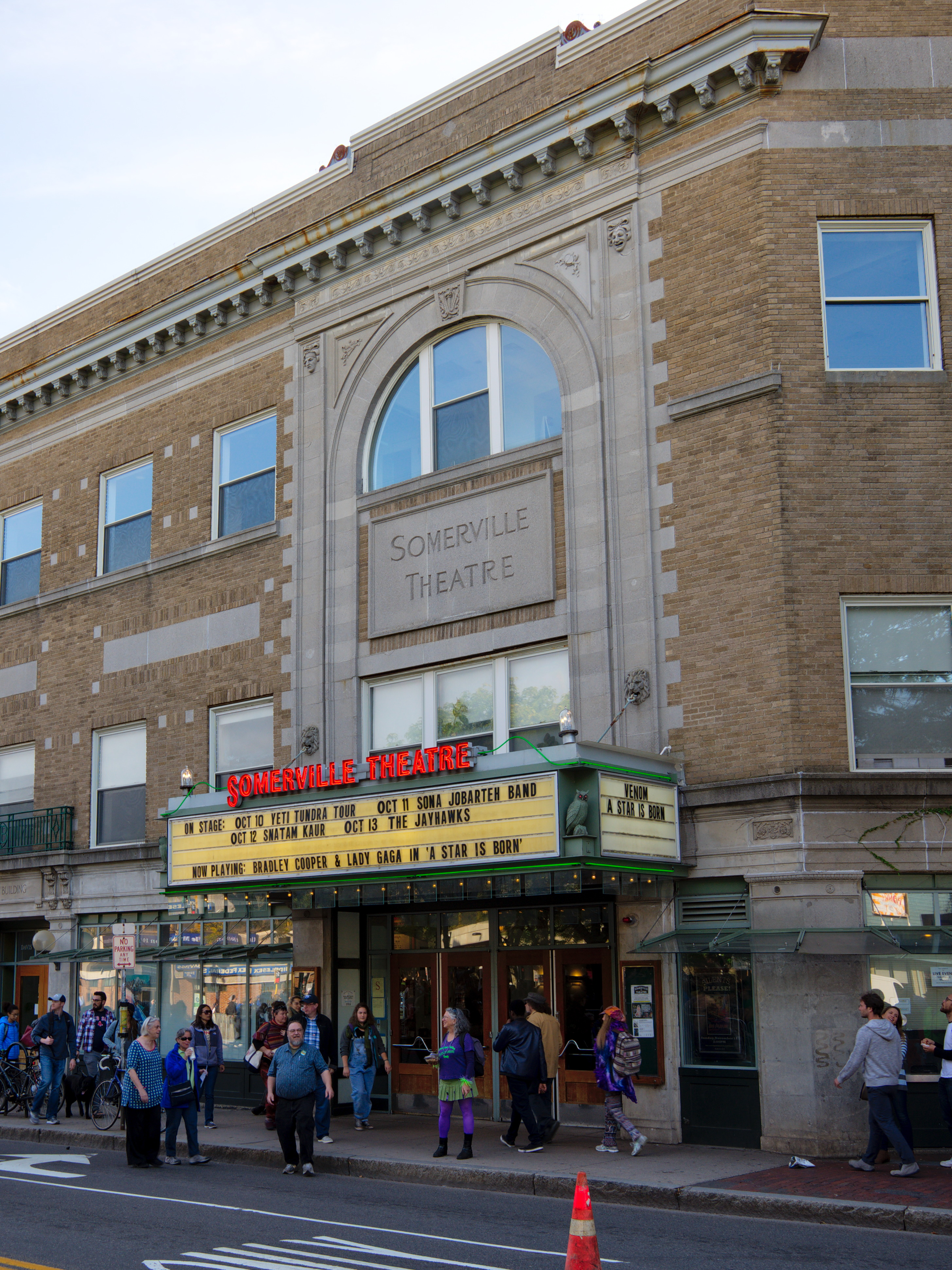
The front entrance of the theatre

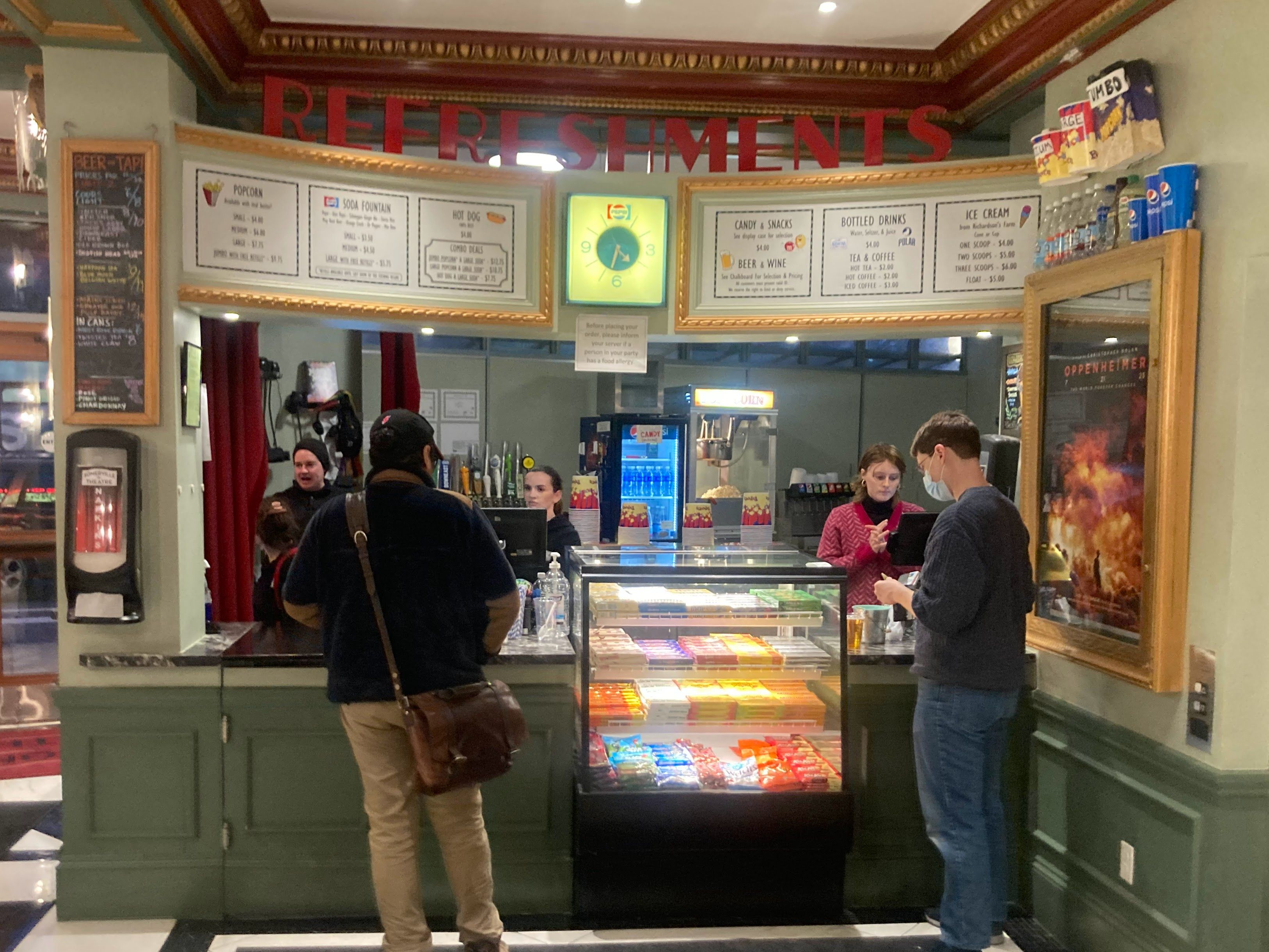
Concession stand

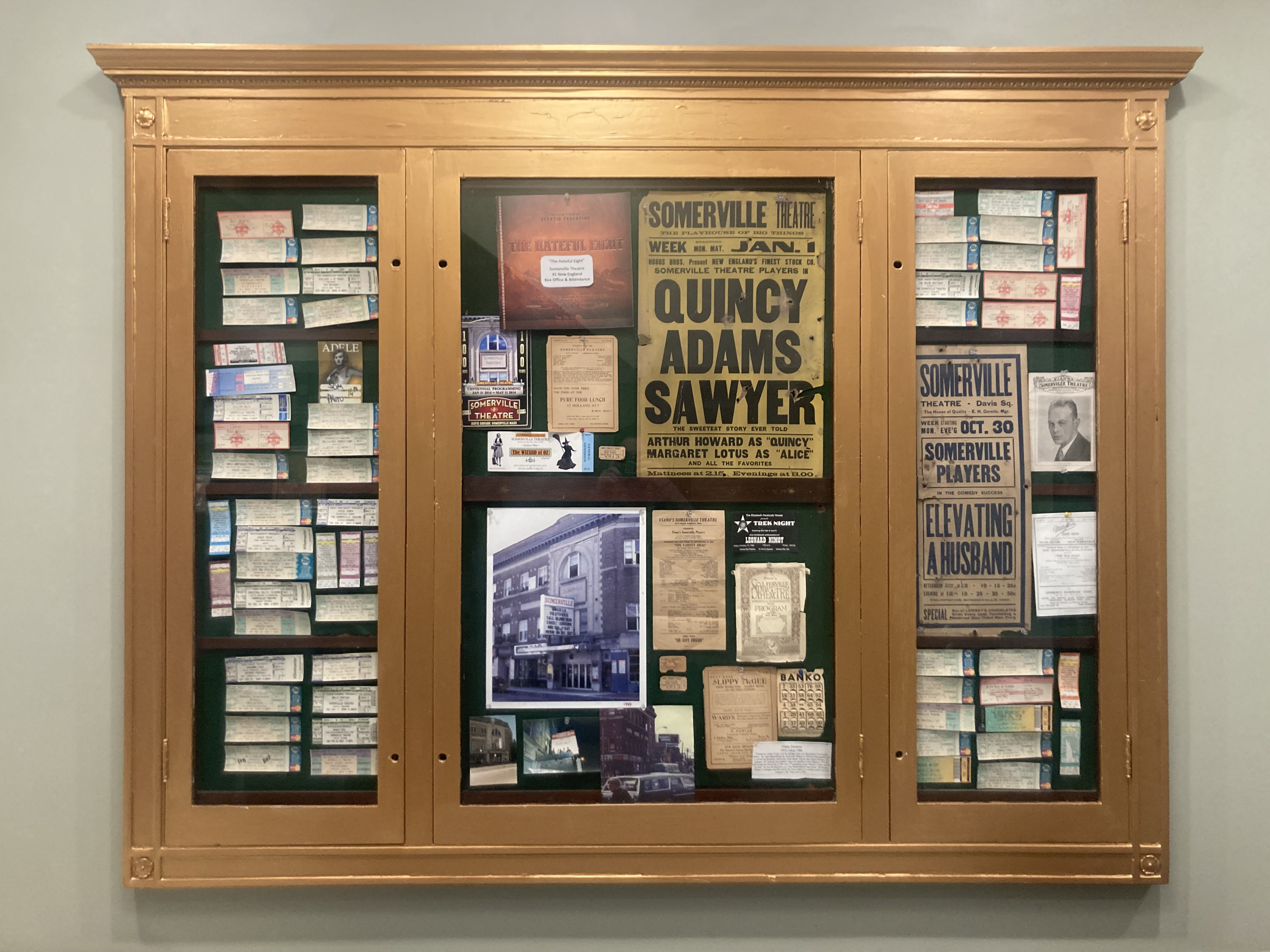
Lobby display with memorabilia

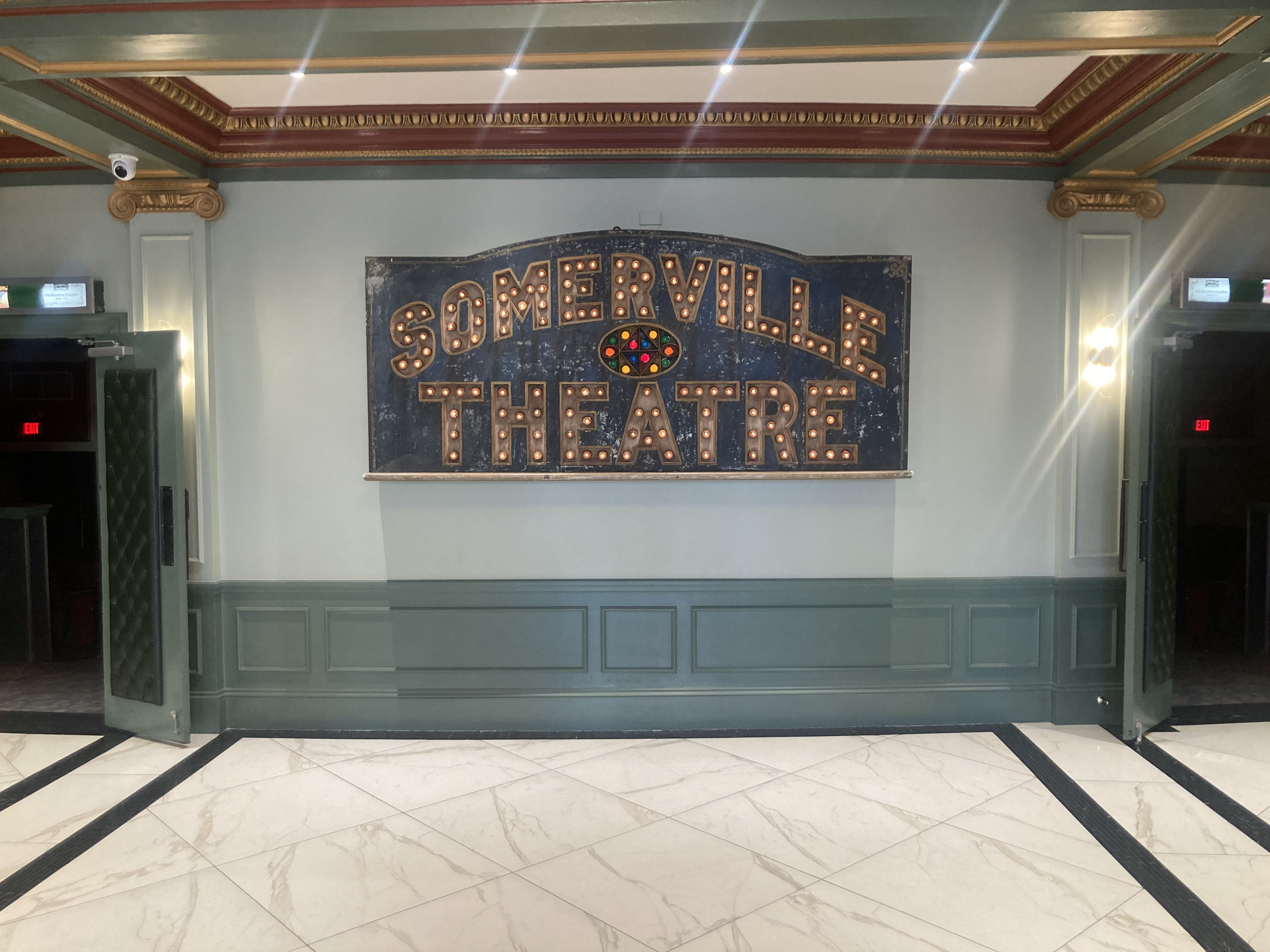
Old theater sign in lobby

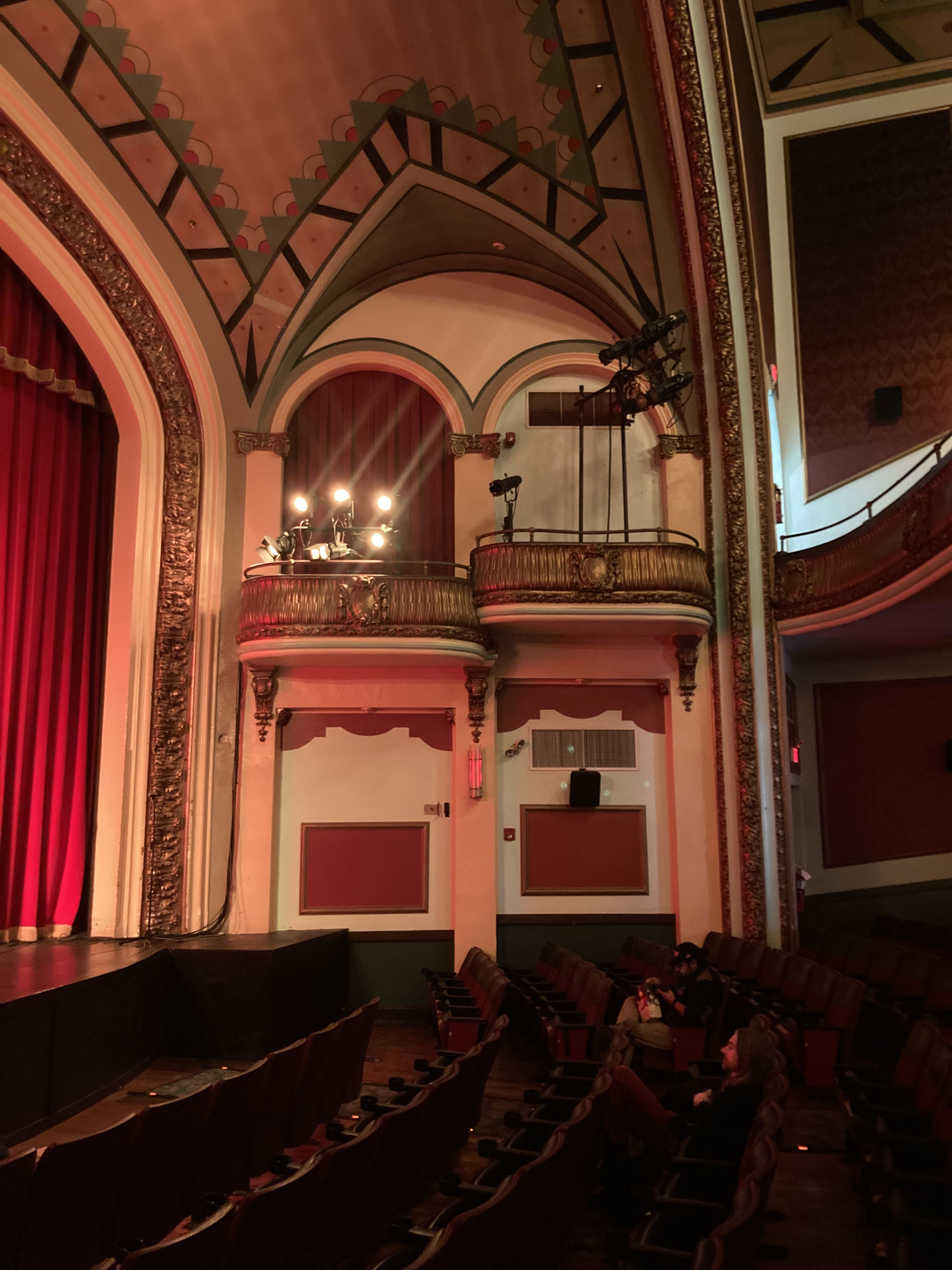
Main theater including balcony

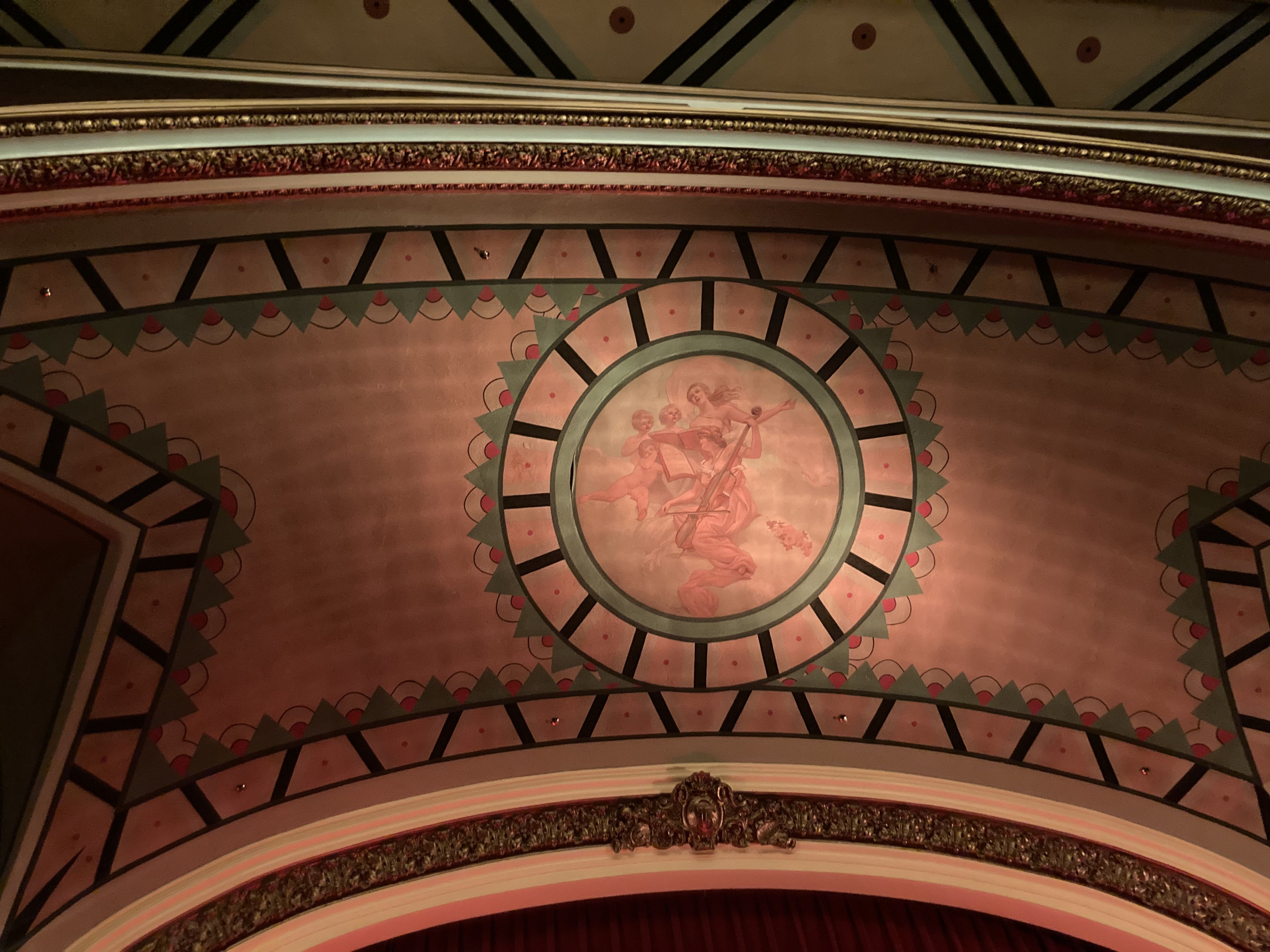
Detail of ceiling mural in main theater

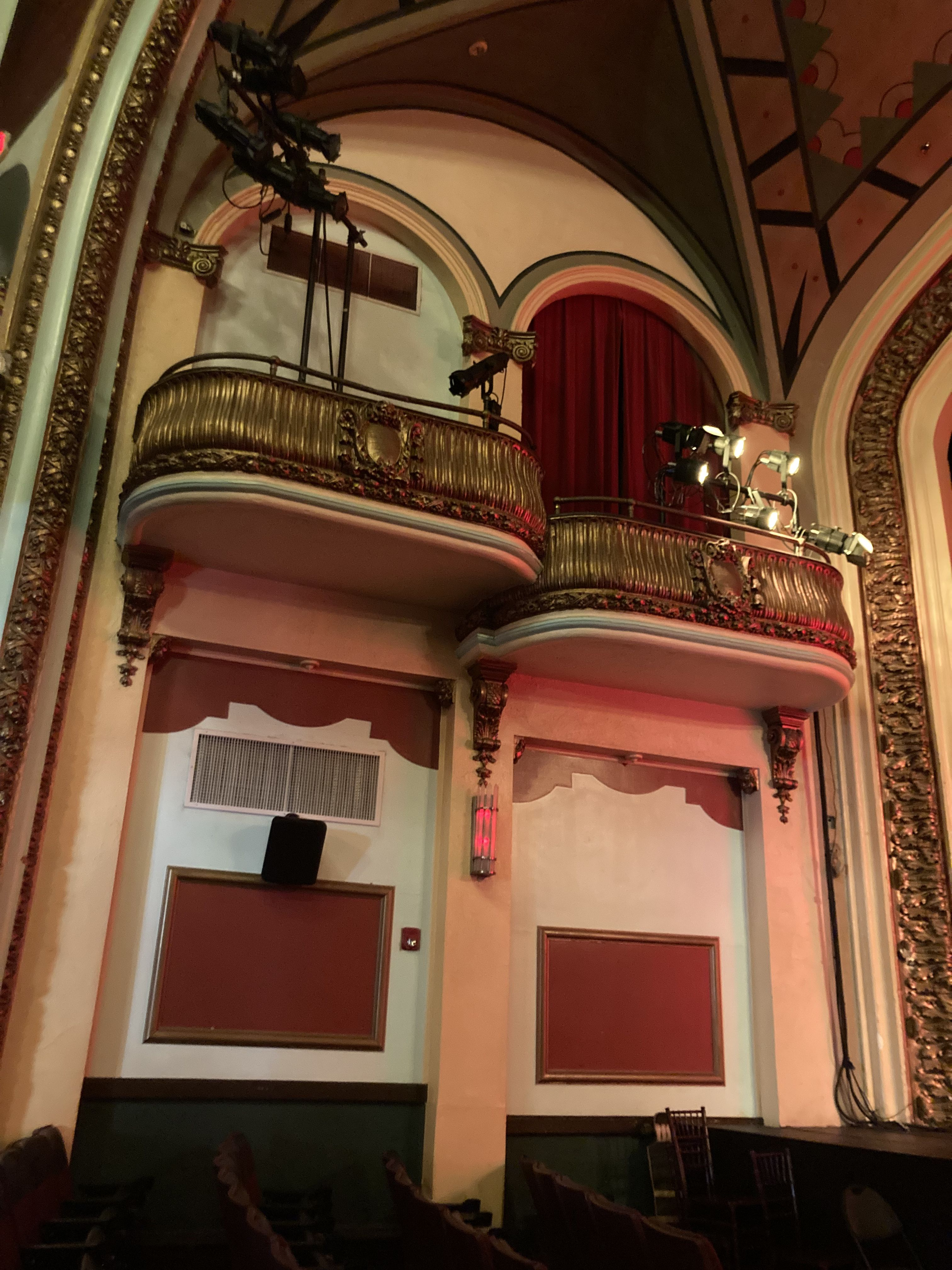
Seats and lighting

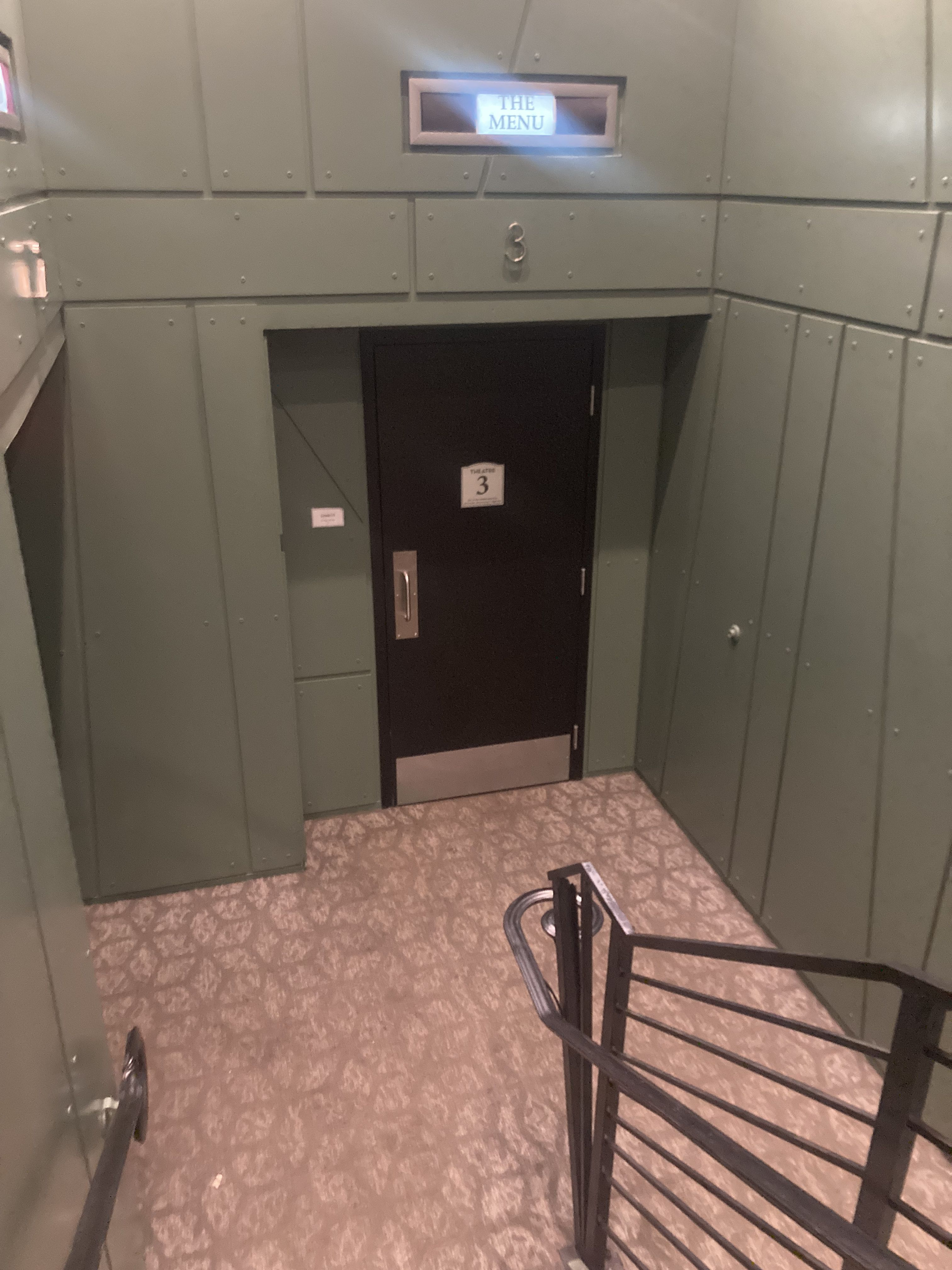
Entrance to auxiliary theater

== See also ==
- National Register of Historic Places listings in Somerville, Massachusetts
