= Circles Around the Sun =

Studio album by Dispatch
- Released: August 21, 2012
- Genre: Rock
- Length: 38:34
- Label: Bomber Records
- Producer: Peter Katis, Dispatch

Dispatch chronology
Dispatch EP (2011)	Circles Around the Sun (2012)	America, Location 12 (2017)

Professional ratings
Review scores
Source	Rating
Consequence of Sound	3.5/5 stars

Circles Around the Sun is a 2012 album by United States indie/roots folk band Dispatch. It is their fifth full-length studio album, the first recorded in over a decade. Speaking with Songfacts.com, the band's vocalist and guitarist Chad Urmston said how it felt recording with Dispatch after all that time: "It's always challenging to put an album together with three different song writers. But being 12 years older and taking all that time away helped as we had a better appreciation for each other." The pre-order was made available on June 5, 2012. The pre-order included various bundle packages, and a download of the track "Josaphine". Synthpop artist Adam Young of Owl City did additional programming on the album.

The song "Circles Around The Sun" was featured in the 2012 video game Need for Speed: Most Wanted and a basic cable and satellite television networks Disney Channel and Disney Channel Asia, as well as Disney Channel original series, Girl Meets World, Stuck in the Middle, and Liv and Maddie.

== Track listing ==
1. "Circles Around The Sun" (Urmston) - 3:35
2. "Not Messin'" (Urmston) - 3:45
3. "Get Ready Boy" (Urmston) - 2:31
4. "Sign Of The Times" (Heimbold/Corrigan/Urmston) - 2:51
5. "Josaphine" (Urmston) - 5:53
6. "Flag" (Corrigan) - 3:34
7. "Come To Me" (Heimbold) - 4:43
8. "Never Or Now" (Urmston) - 3:31
9. "We Hold A Gun" (Corrigan) - 4:17
10. "Feels So Good" (Heimbold) - 3:56

== Personnel ==
- Brad Corrigan - vocals, drums, rhythm & lead guitar, ukulele, charango, keyboards, harmonica, percussion
- Pete Francis - vocals, bass guitar, rhythm & lead guitar, keyboards, drums
- Chadwick Stokes Urmston - vocals, rhythm & lead guitar, bass guitar, keyboards, percussion

Additional musicians

- Craig Dreyer - keyboards, tenor saxophone, flute - all tracks
- Reinaldo DeJesus - percussion - all tracks except track 5
- Boo Reiners - banjo, mandolin - 1, 2, 3, 4, 6, 7, 8, 9
- Kenny Shaw - drums - 1, 2, 3, 4, 6, 7, 8, 9
- Background vocals on Feels So Good - Paul Maddison, Kenny Shaw, Rey DeJesus
- Hand Claps on Circles Around The Sun - Jen Bruecker, Jeff Breucker and Kirk Leftwich
- Adam Young - additional drum programming, mixing, production
- Peter Katis, Greg Giorgio - production, engineering

== Charts ==
=== Peak positions ===
Chart	Peak position
Austrian Albums Chart	58
US Billboard 200	24
US Rock Albums	7
US Digital Albums	10
