= Silent Steeples =

Studio album by Dispatch
- Released: 1996
- Recorded: June – July 1996
- Genre: Rock
- Length: 57:05
- Label: Bomber, Foundations, Universal
- Producer: Dispatch

Dispatch chronology
Silent Steeples (1996)	Bang Bang (1997)

Professional ratings
Review scores
Source	Rating
Allmusic	4/5 stars

Silent Steeples is a 1996 album by American indie/roots folk band Dispatch. Unlike their future releases, the album contained mostly acoustic folk rock songs.

== Track listing ==
1. "Steeples" (Urmston)
2. "Past the Falls" (Corrigan)
3. "Water Stop" (Heimbold)
4. "Hey, Hey" (Heimbold, Urmston, Corrigan)
5. "Flying Horses" (Urmston)
6. "Questioned Apocalypse" (Urmston)
7. "Seasons: Movement III" (Corrigan)
8. "Mayday" (Heimbold)
9. "Born Normal" (Urmston)
10. "Bridges (Strength in Numbers)" (Heimbold)
11. "Walk With You" (Corrigan)
12. "Elias" (Urmston)

== Remastered version ==
A later release of the album with remastered tracks included the following songs after "Elias":

- "Other Side" (Dispatch)
- "Craze" (Dispatch)

== Personnel ==
- Chad Urmston - vocals (tracks 1–6, 8–10, 12), guitar (1, 4–6, 9, 12), percussion (1, 2)
- Pete Heimbold - vocals (1–6, 8–10, 12), guitar (2, 3, 5, 8–10, 12), percussion (2)
- Brad Corrigan - vocals (1–6, 8–12), guitar (1–3, 5, 6–8, 10–12), drums (1, 2, 8), percussion (2), harmonica (5)
- Su Lian Tan - flute (7, 11)
- Christian Teele - tabla (2), percussion (2, 5, 6, 12), drums (3, 5, 6, 9)
- Leif Heimbold - bass guitar (1, 3, 5, 6, 9)
- Mark Christensen - keyboard drone (2), harmonica (11)
- Friends - crowd noise, ping pong (5)
