= William Quigley (artist) =

American painter

- Born: April 29, 1961 (age 65); Pennsylvania, US
- Known for: Painting; Fashion
- Notable work: Boxers, Civil War
- Movement: Urban Realism

William Quigley (born April 29, 1961) is an American painter from Philadelphia, Pennsylvania.

== Education ==
William Quigley graduated from the Philadelphia College of Art in 1984 with a BFA. While at Philadelphia College of Art, he also studied sculpture, painting and printmaking abroad at Tyler School of Art in Italy from 1982–83.

In 1984, Quigley enrolled at the University of Pennsylvania to study political science and art.

From 1985–1987, he attended the Columbia University Graduate School of Fine Arts in New York City.

== Career ==
William Quigley has over 475 collectors of his artwork. In June 1985, before entering Columbia University, Quigley had his first show with Andy Warhol in Philadelphia at Henry S. McNeil's Gallery in Warhol's "Images of a Child's World" exhibition. Through McNeil, Quigley began his early career by exhibiting in group shows with artists such as Julian Schnabel and Jean Michel Basquiat.

While participating in the ARTLA Fair in December 1992–93, Quigley met Art Basel founder Ernst Beyeler and Spanish art dealers Ferran and Marisa Cano. They offered Quigley the opportunity to paint for eight months in Mallorca in June 1992 and show on the property of Joan Miró's studio. During this period, Quigley made 44 works for the gallery.

After returning to Los Angeles, he opened the art gallery Mayb, which became the AB Gallery in 1994. In 1998 and 1999, Quigley traveled to India and made a series of works. In 1999, he set up a second studio in SoHo, New York. Quigley's move to New York sparked a period of working with bands such as Dispatch and Pete Francis. He created albums and stages and developed a company called "Skrapper" with Francis.

While trying to make a living in Los Angeles, Quigley turned to film, commercials and music videos. He worked as an art director and set designer on the sets of directors such as David Fincher, Gregory Dark and Dick George. He was involved in films such as Punch the Clock and Dark Side of Genius, and music videos such as Madonna's "Oh Father", "Express Yourself" and "Like a Prayer". Quigley's work has been collected by over 450 people worldwide. Portraits of influential figures such as President Bill Clinton and athlete Shaquille O'Neal are some of his most prominent works.

== Works ==
=== The Boxer Series ===
In 1999, downtown New York artist William Quigley was commissioned to create a "no contemporary" fighter painting for a friend. The Boxer Series is a work in progress that investigates the impact of the boxing fighter since its birth in the late 1800s. Consisting of portraits, traditional boxing poses, head-to-head battles, and knockdown.

=== Civil War Show ===
This show consisted of 16 paintings, one carved sculpture of a 15-year-old black Union soldier, and a 40-page hand-painted book visually illustrating an interplanetary diary of the War. As the series developed, the theme was later developed to focus on freedom and Black culture.

=== The Civil War Book ===
The Civil War Book was the fourth book written by William Quigley. Originally intended to be a sketch pad for ideas and information about the American Civil War, it later became a complement to the Civil War paintings and was shown at the Lawrence Gallery in 1996. The book's design incorporates war documentation, random notes, photos and battlefield tales.

== Bibliography ==
- Andy Warhol: at McNeil Gallery/Fledging new artist William Quigley, Philadelphia Inquirer, June 1985
- Sculptured Skywriting and Mythic Photography, Victoria Donohoe, Page C03, Philadelphia Inquirer, July 20, 1985
- New Art, Phillip Dash, Details Magazine, May 1991
- Dark Side of Genius, Filmmaker Magazine, 1993
- William Quigley: del expresimo a la tradition, Maria J.Bonafe, Ultima Hora, Mallorca, Spain, October 21, 1993
- William Quigley: at Ferran Cano, El Pais, Television Guide, Madrid, Spain, October 1993
- Trebals de Mallorca: William Quigley, Juan Gacra Sevilla, El Diario De Mallorca, October 1993
- Thin on Attitude, Susan Kandell, Los Angeles Times, February 1994
- AB Gallery Opens Moves and Changes (feature Galley Guide) New York, LA, 1994
- I want to Touch Life, Pankaj Tuli, Hindustan Times, Delhi India, October 1998
- A survey of Paintings (published in Delhi by American Artist) The Times of India, Arts section, November 1998
- Quigley Hangs in My House, Michael Allante, Vanity Fair, March 1999
- Fame Brushes, Ryan D'Agostino, New York Observer, September 2002
- How to Spend a Million Dollars, Ryan D'Agostino, MBA Jungle, October 2002
- New Light Gallery, Anne Jennings, Virginia, September 2000
- Its Time For My Closeup Mr. Quigley, Amanda Von Poggense, Zink Magazine, September 2004
- Side Dish, Joanna Molloy, NY Daily News, May 25, 2004
- Fame Brushes, Joanna Molloy, NY Daily News, June 1, 2004
- Page Six, Richard Johnson, NY Post, June 2, 2004
- Page Six, Richard Johnson, NY Post, June 15, 2004
- Now Served: a course in Restaurants Cater to Art, Joe Dziemianowicz, NY Daily News, Sept 15, 2004
- Jasper, Joanna Molloy, NY Daily News, August 10, 2004

=== Selected permanent collections ===
- Andy Warhol Estate, New York, NY
- Beyeler Foundation, Basel, Switzerland
- Institute of Contemporary Art, Philadelphia, PA
- Keith Haring Estate, New York, NY
- Galleria Ferran Cano Foundation, Mallorca, Spain
- Conejo Valley Museum, Santa Barbara, CA
- Douglas Cramer Collection, Santa Ynez Valley, CA
- Bradford Mill Wheelhouse, Concord, MA
- MOCA, Los Angeles, CA
- Muhammad Ali Foundation, Louisville, KY
- Philadelphia Museum of Art, Philadelphia, PA
- Scottsdale Contemporary Museum of Art, Scottsdale, AZ
- William DeKooning Estate, East Hampton, NY
- Manny Silverman Collection, Los Angeles, CA
- Beal Related, Boston, MA
- Henry McNeil Collection, Fort Washington, PA

=== Individual exhibitions ===
- 2019 SCOPE MIAMI, AB Gallery NY, December 2019, Miami, FL
- ART MARKET HAMPTONS, AB Gallery NY, July 3–7, Bridgehampton, NY
- SKRAPSTRACTIONS, AB Gallery NY, August 15-Sept 9, East Hampton, NY
- 2018 VIA EASTHAMPTON, Skrapper Studio, July East Hampton, NY
- NEW PRINTS, Benefit for Concord Cancer Center, May, Chadds Ford, PA
- RONJO, Commission painted 1960 Ronjo Sculpture, Montauk Beach House, Montauk, NY
- VICE TV, Producer Director Dominic Musacchio, Mick Jagger Video, New York
- 2017 UNTITLED ABSTRACTIONS, curated by Sam Keller, Skrapper Studio, July, East Hampton, NY
- STEWARDSHIP OF THE ARTS AWARD, The Umbrella, May, Concord, MA
- #NO FILTER/THE BOXERS, Montauk Beach House, July, Montauk, NY
- VICE TV, Producer Director Dominic Musacchio, Tom Brady Video, New York
- 2016 FROM LOS ANGELES TO EAST HAMPTON AND BACK AGAIN, Karl Hutter Fine Art, April 29-May 20, Beverly Hills, CA
- SELECT ART FAIR, Sensei Gallery, December, Miami, FL
- 2015 ROCK STARS AND POLITICIANS, Skrapper Studio, August, East Hampton, NY
- 2013 THE PLEASURISTS, New Works, Skrapper Studio, July, East Hampton, NY
- THE PRICE CENTER hosts WILLIAM QUIGLEY, Chris Quidley Gallery, April 4-May
- NEW PRINTS, Artspace, The Wheelhouse/Bradford Mill, February, Concord, MA
- 2011 I HAD IT ALL ALONG, 71 Mercer Street Gallery, March, New York, NY
- 2010 LETS DO THIS AGAIN, 71 Mercer Street Gallery, October, New York, NY
- 2008 ART MIAMI, Quigley New Abstract Works, 71 Mercer Street Gallery, Decemb
- 2007 VH1 VISUAL ARTIST OF THE YEAR, Lincoln Center, Honorees William and Hillary
- Roger Waters, John Sykes, Jon Bon Jovi, John Mayer, Lincoln Center, New York
- 2006 NEW WORKS, Red Bull Space, Watts St. February, New York, NY
- ABC TV LIFE STYLES OF THE RICH AND FAMOUS, LIFE OF LUXURY, George Hamilton
- William Quigley, Madonna, Paul McCartney, Ceech Marin, Dennis Hopper. ABC TV, New York
- 2003 AS IS, 71 Mercer Street Gallery, April, New York, NY
- 2002 IRELAND SHOW, 71 Mercer Street Gallery, Jurys Berkeley Court Hotel, October, Dublin, Ireland
- 2000 27 SKRAPPERS, MayB Gallery, June, New York
- 1999 I ALWAYS WANTED TO GO TO IRELAND, MayB Gallery, Starett Lehigh Bldg., April, New You
- IRVINE MEDICAL CENTER, CANCER CENTER OF IRVINE CENTER PERMANENT COLLECTION, Irvine, CA
- 1998 SURVEY Of PAINTINGS FROM INDIA, Release of new book, Cypher Fine Art, September, Los Angeles and Delhi, India,
- THE INDIA DRAWINGS, Defense Colony Gallery, GK 2, Sept, Delhi, India
- 1997 UNTITLED, collection of paintings in the home of Abdoul Sesay, March, Los Angeles, CA
- NEW PAINTINGS Heidi Voltafiedl Gallery, January, Basel, Switzerland
- MINI MALL SHOW REVISITED, AB Gallery, December, Los Angeles
- 1996 CIVIL WAR PAINTINGS, Lawrence Gallery, October, Beverly Hills
- THE MINI MALL SHOW, AB Gallery, April, Hollywood, CA
- NEW WORKS, CANCER CENTER OF IRVINE CENTER PERMANENT COLLECTION, Irvine, CA
- 1995 NEW PAINTINGS, Ikon Fine Art, Gramercy Art Fair, Chateau Marmount, December, Los Angeles, CA
- THE MINI MALL SHOW, AB Gallery, Mini Mall Six, Sunset/ Highland, December, Hollywood, CA
- 1994 NEW PAINTINGS, AB Gallery, Robertson Blvd. February, Los Angeles, CA
- 1993 ART BASEL 1993, Galeria Ferran Cano, December, Basel, Switzerland
- UNIVERSITY OF PENNSYLVANIA Hospital Gallery, Dept. of Neurosurgery, Permanent Collection, Philadelphia, PA
- NINE WORKS The Place, Pazzia Art House, April, Los Angeles, CA
- 1992 ART BASEL 1992, Galeria Ferran Cano/ Ernst Beyeler Gallery, December, Basel, Switzerland
- 1991 WILLIAM QUIGLEY NEW PAINTINGS, Art Services, Manny Silverman Gallery, November, Los Angeles, CA
- 1990 BLACK AND BLOO, Sylvester Stallone and William Quigley, April, Los Angeles, CA
- UNTITLED, Manny Silverman Gallery, July, Los Angeles, CA
- 1989 NEW QUIGLEY WORKS, Tendler/Brachman, February, New York, NY
- 1987 NEW WORKS, Andrew Calle Gallery, November, Paris, France
- 1985 PRINTS AND DRAWINGS BY QUIGLEY, Steward Lamlee Gallery, September, New York, NY
- ABSTRACTIONS/ APPROPRIATIONS, Henry McNeil Gallery, July, Philadelphia, PA
- ANDY WARHOL/ WILLIAM QUIGLEY, Henry S. McNeil Gallery, June, Philadelphia, PA

=== Group exhibitions ===
- 1984 – PHILADELPHIA COLLEGE OF ART AWARD SHOW, UNIVERSITY OF THE ARTS, June, Philadelphia
- 1985 – IMAGES OF A CHILD'S WORLD, Andy Warhol, McNeil Gallery, June, Philadelphia
  - APPROPRIATIONS/ABSTRACTIONS, McNeil Gallery, July, Philadelphia
- 1986 – TWO GERMANS, ONE AMERICAN, Klaus Nuefert Gallery, May, Cologne, Germany
- 1987 – ART FIGHTING AIDS, McNeil Gallery, May, Philadelphia
  - ART AGAINST AIDS, Tendler/Brachman, June, New York
  - ART FIGHTING AIDS, PORT AUTHORITY MUSEUM, June, Philadelphia
- 1989 – FOURTH INTERNATIONAL CONTEMPORARY ART FAIR, Manny Silverman Gallery, December, Los Angeles
- 1990 – 100 EMERGING ARTISTS PHILADELPHIA MUSEUM OF ART, May, Philadelphia
  - FIFTH INTERNATIONAL CONTEMPORARY ART FAIR William Turner Gallery, Los Angeles
  - LOS ANGELES FREE CLINIC HEALTH AUCTION June, Los Angeles
  - Gail Feingarten Gallery, Los Angeles
  - Couturier Gallery, January, Los Angeles
- 1991 – Manny Silverman Gallery, Los Angeles
  - CHRISTMAS SHOW 8500 Holloway, May b Gallery, Los Angeles
- 1992 – ART '23 BASEL, Galeria Ferran Cano, July, Basel, Switzerland
  - Free Clinic of Los Angeles Auction, February, Los Angeles
  - Metropolitan Art Gallery, May, Los Angeles
- 1993 – THE NEW PIER SHOW CHICAGO INTERNATIONAL ART FAIR, Galeria Ferran Cano, May, Chicago
  - "THE LIVING ROOM SHOW" MAY b Gallery, June, Los Angeles
  - COUNTDOWN TO THE NEXT MILLENIUM, LACE Gallery, April, Los Angeles
- 1994 – SIXTH BIENNIAL ART AUCTION MUSEUM OF CONTEMPORARY ART June, Los Angeles
  - PROJECT ANGEL FOOD, Pacific Design Center, December, Los Angeles
  - LA ART FAIR, December, Los Angeles
- 1995 – BUTTERFIELD & BUTTERFIELD, December Auction Project Angel Food, December, Los Angeles
  - RAINFORREST, Laddie John Dill Studio, December, Venice, CA
  - LAST EXIT, Soho West Gallery, January, Los Angeles
  - OUT WITH THE OLDE, Jeffrey Gold Gallery, April, New York
- 1996 – NEW PAINTINGS, Gramercy Art Fair, December, New York
  - COLLECTION OF CHARLES CRAIG, CONEJO VALLEY MUSEUM, May, Conejo Valley, CA
  - CHICAGO ART FAIR, Ferran Cano Gallery, May, Chicago
  - CHRISTMAS SHOW, Couturier Gallery, December, Los Angeles
- 1998 – NAVY PIER, CHICAGO ART FAIR, Ferran Cano Gallery, May, Chicago
- 2000 – NEW LIGHT GALLERY, New Light Gallery, May, Abingdon, Virginia
- 2001 – NEW LIGHT GALLERY, New Light Gallery, August, Abingdon, Virginia
- 2003 – JUDGEMENT DAY, PablosBirthday, December, New York
- 2003 – SCOPE, Gavensvort Hotel, December, New York
- 2004 – ART IS NOT UNTOUCHABLE, Pablos Birthday, April, New York
- 2012 – THE WHEELHOUSE, 30 artists, April, Concord, MA
- 2013 – THE PLEASURISTS, Skrapper Studio, July, East Hampton, NY
- 2014 – THE PLEASURISTS, Skrapper Studio, July, East Hampton, NY
- 2015 – THE PLEASURISTS, Skrapper Studio, July, East Hampton, NY
- 2016 – ARTISTS AND WRITERS GAME SHOW, Skrapper Studio, 40 artists, July, East Hampton, NY
- 2017 – THE PLEASURISTS, Skrapper Studio, July, East Hampton, NY
- 2018 – VIA EAST HAMPTON, Skrapper Studio, July, East Hampton, NY
- 2019 – MARKET ART AND DESIGN, July, Bridgehampton, NY
- 2019 – GOD ALWAYS KNOWS, AB NY Gallery, August, East Hampton, NY
- 2019 – TEXAS CONTEMPORARY, George R Brown Convention Center, October, Houston, TX

== See also ==
- Jasper Johns
- Francis Picabia
- Willem Dekooning
- Jackson Pollock
