= Untold =

Untold or The Untold may refer to:

== Film and television ==
- Untold (film series), an American sports documentary series
- The Untold (film), a 2002 Canadian horror film
- Untold (film), a 2025 Philippine horror film
- Untold (TV series), a 2014 American news program

== Music ==
- Untold Festival, in Romania
- Untold (musician), British producer
- Untold (album), by Pete Francis, 2003
- The Untold, an album by Atrium Carceri, 2013
- "Untold", a song by Matthew West from Live Forever, 2015

== Other uses ==
- Untold (horse) (1983–2005), a British Thoroughbred racehorse
- The Untold, a British radio programme presented by Grace Dent

== See also ==
- Untold Story (disambiguation)
- Untold Stories (disambiguation)
- Stories Untold (disambiguation)
- 2006: Varanasi the Untold, an unreleased Indian Hindi-language film
