= Untold Story =

Untold Story may refer to:

- Untold Story (album), a 2004 album by The Game
- Untold Story (novel), a 2011 novel by Monica Ali
- "An Untold Story", an episode of Once Upon a Time
- The Untold Story, a 1993 Hong Kong film
- "The Untold Story", a 2020 song by Annie from Dark Hearts

== See also ==
- Untold Stories (disambiguation)
- Delhi Riots 2020: The Untold Story, a 2020 book by Monika Arora, Sonali Chitalkar and Prerna Malhotra about the 2020 Delhi riots
- M.S. Dhoni: The Untold Story, a 2016 Indian biographical film
- Rekha: The Untold Story, a 2016 biography of Indian actress Rekha by Yasser Usman
