= So They Say (album) =

Studio album by Pete Francis
- Released: 2001
- Genre: Progressive rock
- Label: Scrapper Records
- Producer: Pete Francis

Pete Francis chronology
So They Say (2001)	Untold (2003)

So They Say is Pete Francis's first solo album. So They Say features acoustic music with some pop influence, similar to earlier works of his former band, Dispatch. The songs, "Burning the River" and "Carry You", were often played together with Dispatch, and "Carry You" was re-recorded for a Dispatch record. Other songs on the album remain in live rotation, such as "Father Rose" and "If I May."

== Track listing ==
1. Burning The River
2. Father Rose
3. During The Storm
4. If I May
5. Train Window
6. I Don't Wanna Fight
7. Auburndale
8. Carry You
9. Go Ridin'
10. So They Say
