= The Savior (Once Upon a Time) =

- Once Upon a Time episode
- Episode no.: Season 6 Episode 1
- Directed by: Eagle Egilsson
- Written by: Edward Kitsis & Adam Horowitz
- Production code: 601
- Original air date: September 25, 2016

Guest appearances
- Deniz Akdeniz as Aladdin; Beverly Elliot as Granny; Oded Fehr as Jafar; Hank Harris as The Groundsman/Dr. Jekyll; Giles Matthey as Morpheus; Raphael Sbarge as Archie Hopper; Sam Witwer as The Warden/Mr. Hyde

Episode chronology
← Previous "An Untold Story"	Next → "A Bitter Draught"
- Once Upon a Time season 6

"The Savior" is the first episode of the sixth season of the American fantasy drama series Once Upon a Time, which aired on September 25, 2016.

In this episode, the residents must deal with Mr. Hyde's sudden arrival in Storybrooke as the new owner, as well as bringing the residents from The Land of Untold Stories along with him, which suddenly causes Emma to experience a strange side effect involving the new refugees, while Regina prepares to bond with Zelena, which is about to be tested by Regina's other half, The Evil Queen. In the Land of Untold Stories, Gold is given a chance to enter Belle's dreams as he encounters Morpheus, while in the past the origins of the Savior are detailed between the confrontation from Aladdin and Jafar, which could affect Emma's role in the present day.

== Plot ==
=== Opening sequence ===
Jafar rides the magic carpet around the forest.

=== Event chronology ===
- The Agrabah events takes place "many years" earlier, after "Street Rats" and before Jafar leaves Agrabah for Wonderland in Once Upon a Time in Wonderland.
- The Land of Untold Stories and Storybrooke events takes place after "An Untold Story".

=== In the Characters' Past ===
Jafar chases a man across a desert towards Aladdin's home, killing the man just after Aladdin declines to aid him. Jafar taunts Aladdin for failing as a savior, and over the fact that saviors never "live happily ever after". Aladdin's hand is then shown, spasming uncontrollably.

=== In Storybrooke ===
As Emma and Hook try to spend romantic time together, they hear a rumbling sound from above and are joined by Regina, Henry, David, and Snow to find a dirigible from the Land of Untold Stories hovering around the town. They confront Hyde, who as the town's new owner, has brought the residents from the land of Untold Stories with him. Both Emma and Regina try to use magic to stop him, but fail. When they see the blimp crash into the forest, they search for survivors but find no one (although Snow and David find the displaced arrivals later on), Jekyll tells the residents that they can use the baton that powered the dirigible to create a device to stop Hyde. As they go through the wreckage, Emma feels her hand move strangely. Later on, the residents create a weapon that successfully takes care of Hyde and he is placed in jail, when Emma suddenly experiences a strange vision that causes her hand to shake again, Hyde becomes aware of this.

After receiving advice from Archie, Emma decides to confront Hyde about the vision while she pays him a visit at the psychiatric ward at the hospital where he being held. Hyde is aware of Emma's life behind bars and tests her to see if she is in fear even if she is in denial and makes his point when her hand started shaking. Hyde gives Emma the answer and he tells her to follow a red bird. Later that night, Emma takes the advice after she sees one during the search for survivors, and it leads Emma to The Oracle, a young girl who gives Emma a vision of her future as The Savior, which reveals a confrontation with an unknown attacker who plans to kill Emma as she was defending her family; The Oracle also hints of many paths Emma could take but the outcome might or might not change. When Emma returns to confront Hyde about this, he explain that the person she'll face in the future will be her ending but given his previous encounters with those that came before her, he tells Emma that the enemy is among the residents, so Emma decides for her family's sake to keep this to herself.

Meanwhile, Regina and Zelena, despite their renewed bonding as sisters, are not seeing things eye to eye as they argue over the loss of Robin Hood and Regina's decision to split from her evil half (which also weakened her powers), and Zelena is already looking at moving out and find a new place for her and Robin. Zelena is angry Regina decided to destroy the part of herself that was most like her, leaving the sisters with less in common; adding to the fact is that Regina didn't confide with Zelena, but Snow White instead. After a talk with Snow and Henry, Regina is ready to make amends and start a new chapter in her life; Unfortunately, when Zelena returned to her place, The Evil Queen is there waiting to offer Zelena a drink and to bond together.

=== In the Land of Untold Stories ===
Following Hyde's instructions, Gold enters the Temple of Morpheus and uses magical sand to enter Belle's dream. In the dream, Morpheus acts as Gold's guide, giving him an hour to free Belle from the sleeping curse; if he fails, Belle's soul will be banished to the netherworld forever. Belle is reliving her experiences as Rumplestiltskin's servant, so he tries to recreate the circumstances under which they first fell in love. He succeeds, culminating in a kiss, but this causes her memories to return and she pulls back. She refuses to repeat the pain she experienced as a result of their relationship and tells Gold that their child is better off without him, leaving Gold hurt. "Morpheus" then reveals himself to actually be Gold and Belle's unborn child; satisfied that Belle will not resume her relationship with Gold, he then warns her to not let Gold destroy them like he did to his first family, he frees his mother from the sleeping curse with a kiss on the forehead. Gold is left bereft as even his unborn child hates him. Belle wakes up but before returning to Storybrooke through Gold's portal, she tells Gold that she will listen to their son's warning and never have a life with him again.

== Production ==
There was also a mistake in the actual episode credits, where Deniz Akdeniz's firstname is spelled "Dennis". Ingrid Torrance is mistakenly credited as "Nurse Ratchet", instead of "Nurse Ratched". Jordyn Ashley Olson is misspelled as "Jordan", instead of "Jordyn". Farris Tyab is credited without a character name, while he was not credited at all in the episode.

A few scenes of this episode and the following episode "A Bitter Draught" were filmed simultaneously.

=== Title ===
The title of this episode was revealed by Adam Horowitz via his Twitter account on June 25, 2016. The episode title is a reference to the former Savior, Aladdin.

=== Cultural references ===
In Belle's dream, she and Rumplestiltskin dance to an instrumental version of the title song from Beauty and the Beast, with Belle wearing a yellow dress similar to the one her Disney counterpart wears in the dance scene from the movie. This also recreates a similar scene from the season four premiere "A Tale of Two Sisters".

The Oracle's red bird is an allusion to Iago from the Aladdin trilogy.

== Reception ==
Justin Kirkland of Entertainment Weekly gave the episode a positive review, citing the Gold/Belle storyline was the part of the episode he liked most.

In IGN's review, reviewer Terri Schwartz did not give the episode a score and instead took time to point out to examine why the dynamics in the episode needs improvement: "Once Upon a Time is faced with the tough challenge of keeping the same fan-favorite relationships engaging year after year in new ways that also don't irreparably change the dynamic of the show. But with the same storylines being told in different variations, it's hard not to be frustrated by seeing characters start to travel down the path they just reached the end of not long before. Hopefully the next time they find resolution to these conflicts, it will prove to have a more lasting impact and allow them to journey somewhere new." It was also the final episode reviewed by the site.
