= Jaffrabad, Delhi =

Jaffrabad zafarabad
- Neighborhood of Delhi
- Location in New Delhi, India
- Coordinates: 28.6827°N 77.27119°E
- Country: India
- State: Delhi
- District: North East
- Established: 1653
- Founder: Zafar Ali (Mughal military commander)

Population (2001)
  - Total: 57,460

Languages
  - Official: Urdu; English
  - Additional official: Punjabi; Hindustani
- Time zone: UTC+5:30 (IST)

Jaffrabad (Sometimes Pronounced as "Zaffrabad") is a census town in North East district in the Indian state of Delhi. The area is predominantly inhabited by the Muslims of Delhi. It is situated near the Yamuna River, sometimes being prone to flooding but mostly safe. Jaffrabad was one of the Key locations during the 2020 Delhi riots(Waged by the Hindutva BJP Candidate Kapil Mishra's Speeches) against the protestors of Citizenship Amendment Act affecting thousands in the nearby areas.

== Demographics ==
As of 2001 India census, Jaffrabad had a population of 1,57,460. Males and Females contribute 53% and 47% respectively.

Jaffrabad has an average literacy rate of 82%, higher than the national average of 59.5%: male literacy is 77%, and female literacy is 70%.

In Jaffrabad, 16% of the population is under 6 years of age.

Religion

According to the census of 2011, in the Jaffrabad area of North East Delhi, the Muslim population is 96%, the remaining 4% is Hindus, Sikhs and others.
