= Howdy Modi =

2019 visit of Narendra Modi to the United States

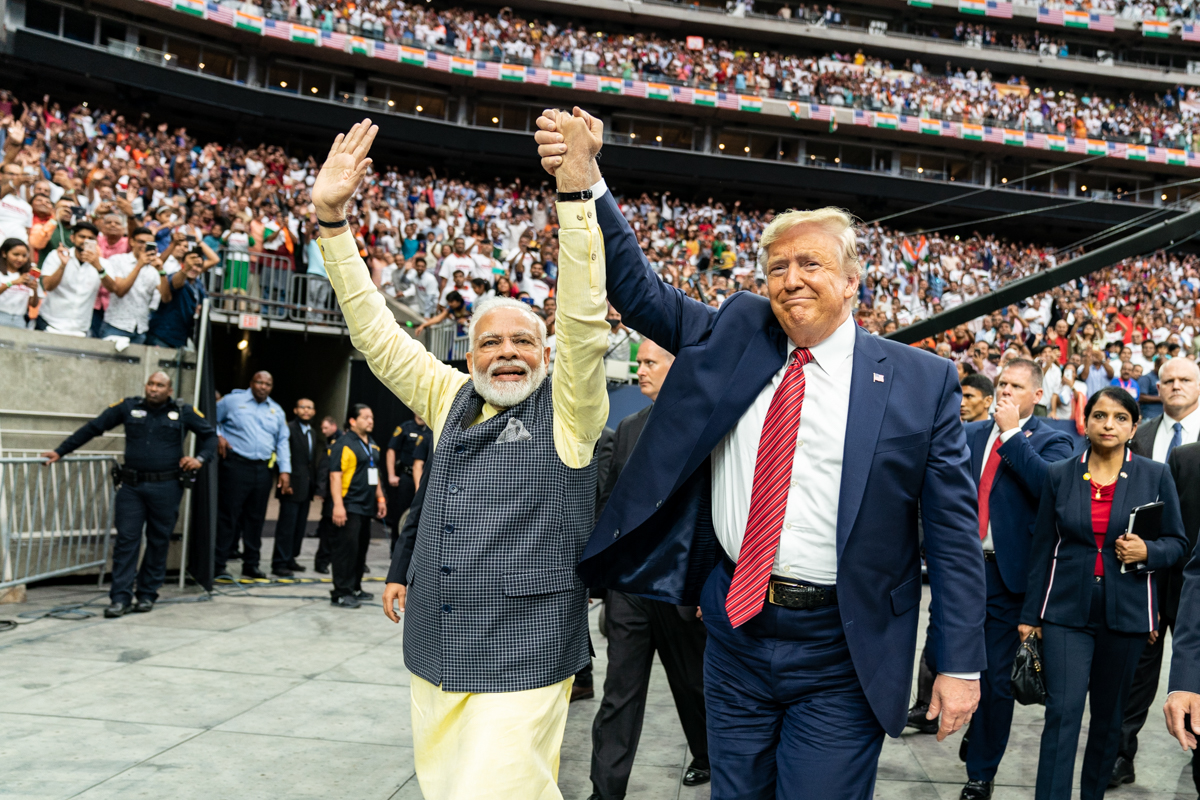
- Date: September 22, 2019
- Venue: NRG Stadium
- Location: Houston, Texas, United States
- Type: Community summit
- Organised by: Texas India Forum; Indian-American community
- Participants: 50,000
- Website: web.archive.org/web/20240113184109/https://howdymodi.org/

Howdy Modi was a community summit and mega event held on September 22, 2019, at the NRG Stadium in Houston, Texas, United States. The event was notable for the joint address by Narendra Modi, the Prime Minister of India, and Donald Trump, the President of the United States, showcasing the strong ties and strategic partnerships between the two countries.

== Background ==
Organized by the Texas India Forum, the event highlighted the contributions of Indian Americans to American society and the strong cultural and economic bonds between India and the United States. Over 50,000 people attended the event, making it one of the largest receptions for a foreign leader in the United States.

== Event details ==
The summit featured a cultural program titled "Woven: The Indian-American Story," celebrating the Indian-American community's contributions to the United States. This was followed by the "Shared Dreams, Bright Futures" session, where both leaders spoke about future collaborations between India and the U.S.

== Speeches ==
- **Narendra Modi** addressed topics such as the strength of Indo-U.S. relations, contributions of the Indian diaspora, and shared democratic values.
- **Donald Trump** spoke about the strategic partnership and economic ties, emphasizing defense, technology, and energy sector collaborations.

== Impact ==
Howdy Modi significantly impacted the Indian-American community, fostering a greater understanding and deeper political engagement. It also underscored the strategic importance of U.S.-India relations on the global stage.

== Reception ==
The event received widespread media coverage and was well-received by the public.

However, opposition parties in India, such as the Indian National Congress, argued that Modi violated foreign policy norms by 'campaigning' for US President Donald Trump with slogans like "Abki baar, Trump sarkar."

== See also ==
- Narendra Modi
- Donald Trump
- Namaste Trump
- India–United States relations
