= Untold Stories =

Untold Stories may refer to:

== Books ==
- Untold Stories, a 2005 book by Alan Bennett

== Film and TV ==
- The Untold Story, a 1993 Hong Kong crime-thriller film
- Untold Stories of the E.R., a docudrama television series
- Untold Stories, a spin-off of the Filipino talk show Face to Face

== Music ==
=== Albums ===
- Untold Stories (Hot Rize album), 1987
- Untold Stories (Heitor Pereira album), 2001

=== Songs ===
- "Untold Stories" (Kathy Mattea song), a 1988 song
- "Untold Stories" (Buju Banton song), a 1995 song

== See also ==
- Untold Story (disambiguation)
- Stories Untold (disambiguation)
- Lady Doctors: The Untold Stories of India's First Women in Medicine, 2021 non-fiction book by Kavitha Rao
