= Pete Francis =

American singer-songwriter

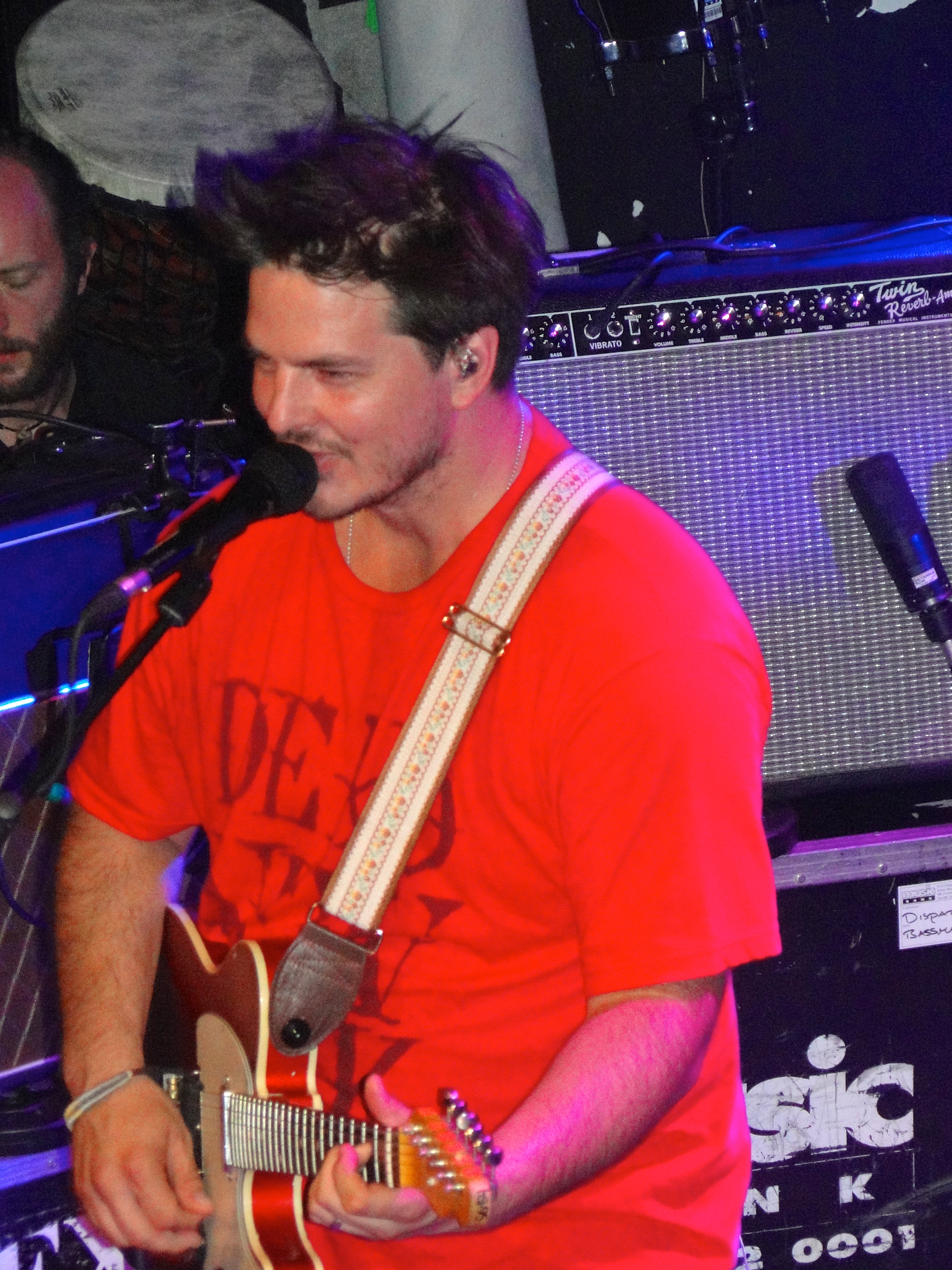
- Pete Francis performing with Dispatch in Germany, Hamburg, 2012

Background information
- Also known as: Pete Francis, RePete
- Born: Pete Francis Heimbold; August 1, 1975 (age 51)
- Genres: Folk rock, Rock
- Occupation: Musician
- Instruments: Guitar, Keyboards, Bass
- Years active: 1994–present
- Label: Dragon Crest Collective, Noble Steed Music
- Website: Official Pete Francis website

Pete Francis Heimbold (August 1, 1975) is a founding member of the alternative roots band Dispatch. Since departing the group in 2019, he has established himself as a producer, songwriter, multi-instrumentalist, mental health advocate, and educator. His latest solo release is PTRN SKY! (out May 12, 2023 on Noble Steed Music).

== Biography ==
Francis grew up in Riverside, Connecticut, the youngest of four children, and drew early influence from the likes of Van Morrison, Cat Stevens, Tom Waits, Joni Mitchell, and Miles Davis. As a student at Middlebury College in Vermont, Francis formed a band with guitarist/bassist/songwriter Chad Urmston and drummer Brad Corrigan. Originally called One Fell Swoop, the group soon changed its name to Dispatch and would go on to sell more than 700,000 albums, sell out New York's Madison Square Garden five times and Boston's TD Garden three times, and become the first group to sell out New Jersey's Red Bull Arena. On July 31, 2004, the band drew more than 100,000 people to Boston's Hatch Memorial Shell.

Francis recorded several solo albums on the side during his years with Dispatch, and in 2023, he announced his first collection since departing the group, PTRN SKY! In Spring 2024, Francis announced the release of Neon Light Blind on reggae imprint Dubshot Records via ADA/Warner Music. The songs on the project were co-written with Grant Michaels (Weezer, Sia, Banners), and take influence from reggae and soul standards that have always been a part of Pete’s musical identity.

In addition to his work as a musician, Francis has also taught songwriting at Middlebury College and collaborated with his wife, the visual artist Katie Heimbold, to launch the Dragoncrest Collective, a community organization that seeks to bring artists and art-lovers together through a series of live, interactive shows and events.

He currently lives in Connecticut.

== Discography ==
For discography of Dispatch, see Dispatch Discography

- 2001: So They Say – Dragon Crest Collective
- 2003: Untold – Dragon Crest Collective
- 2004: Good To Finally Know – Dragon Crest Collective
- 2006: Everything Is One- Dragon Crest Collective
- 2008: Iron Sea and the Cavalry- Dragon Crest Collective
- 2009: Wake the Mountain w/Barefoot Truth- Dragon Crest Collective
- 2010: The Movie We Are In- Dragon Crest Collective
- 2013: Immodal Implozego – Dragon Crest Collective
- 2015: Dragon Crest Collective Volume 1- Dragon Crest Collective
- 2019: Belong to the Band EP- Dragon Crest Collective
- 2021: Humble Down EP- Dragon Crest Collective
- 2021: Sun Fuzz EP- Dragon Crest Collective
- 2023: PTRN SKY!- Dragon Crest Collective
- 2024: Neon Light Blind EP- Dragon Crest Collective

== Equipment ==
Instruments

- Nash Presicion Bass
- Modulus Bass
- 1979 Fender Telecaster
- 1980 Gibson 335 electric guitar
- 1930s National Resonator
- 1940 Gibson 135 Jazz Box
- Collings D-1 acoustics

Amplifiers

- Noise Iconoclast

Effects

- Boss TU2 Chromatic Tuner
- Fulltone Clyde Wah Deluxe
- Fulltone OCD Overdrive
- Boss Analog Delay
