= Modulus Guitars =

American musical instrument manufacturer

- Type: Private
- Industry: Musical instruments
- Founded: 1978; 48 years ago
- Founder: Geoff Gould
- Headquarters: Maple Grove, Minnesota, United States
- Area served: Worldwide
- Products: Bass guitars
- Website: modulusgraphite.com

Modulus Graphite (formerly, Modulus Guitars) is an American manufacturer of musical instruments best known for building bass guitars with carbon fiber necks. The company, originally called Modulus Graphite, was founded in part by Geoff Gould, a bassist who also worked for an aerospace company in Palo Alto, California, and coworker Jerry Dorsch. When they split, Jerry started Graphite Guitar Systems in Washington state.

== History ==
The name is a reference to Young's modulus, a measure of the stiffness of an elastic material, used in the field of solid mechanics. Carbon fiber has an exceptionally high modulus.

Traditionally, electric guitar and bass necks are made from hardwoods (such as maple or mahogany) reinforced with an adjustable steel "truss rod." Wood, being a naturally occurring material, is prone to variations in density and flexibility. This, coupled with the high stresses created by stretching steel strings across them lengthwise, makes wood necks prone to certain unpredictable and undesirable qualities. Among these are twisting, incorrect "bowing" (either too pronounced or too subtle), and "dead spots," or areas on the neck where notes are quieter or more indistinct compared to other areas. Non-traditional neck materials such as carbon fiber and aluminum are attempts to correct these issues by replacing wood with lighter, stiffer, and more uniform components.

Gould was inspired to experiment with non-traditional materials after attending a 1974 Grateful Dead concert, at which he marveled at the size and complexity of Phil Lesh's heavily modified bass (customized by Alembic) and began to consider the possibilities of lighter, stronger materials. After being passed over by his employers in the aerospace industry, the project of creating hollow, carbon fiber bass necks was brought to fruition by Gould and Alembic, who built a bass with a prototype neck and displayed it at a trade show in 1977. Immediately after the trade show, the bass was purchased by Fleetwood Mac bassist John McVie.

Gould and some of his colleagues in the aerospace industry founded Modulus Graphite and began to make necks for Alembic and other companies before moving on to making entire instruments. Geoff Gould left the company in 1996 to form G. Gould instruments

On December 20, 2013, Modulus Guitars LLC was placed into voluntary Chapter 7 arrangements. The company emerged from bankruptcy under Joe Perman, who had previously worked for Modulus, and as of 2021 was making custom basses.

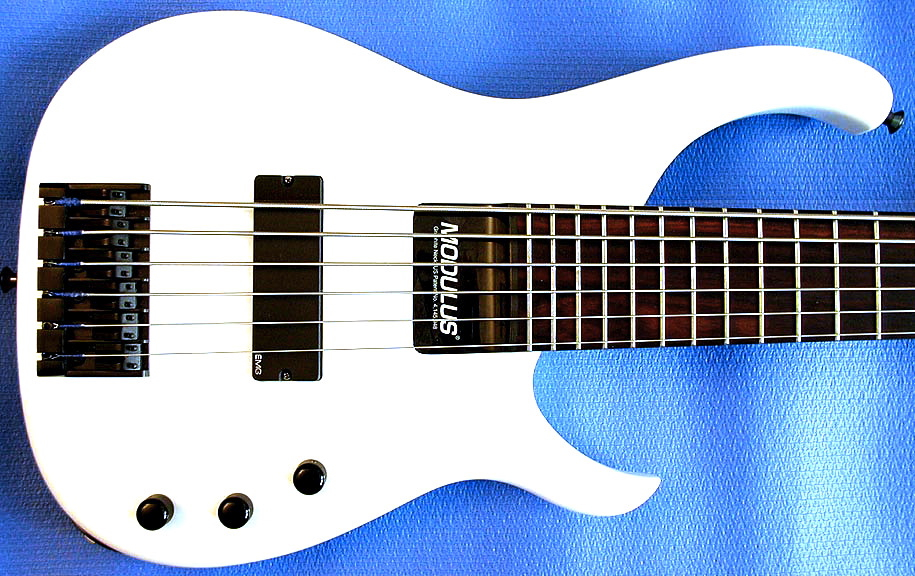
Modulus Sweetspot 6 string bass

== Instruments ==
- SP and SPX (bolt-on and neck-through models)
- BaSSStar - Mostly available as a replacement neck, but some were built as whole instruments(both bolt-on and neck-through models, some headed and headless necks were also available)
- Flight 4 (Headless 4 string basses with the shape of a Space Rocket, Maybe 10-15 known to be built)
- Monocoque (Headless bass with a 1-piece body and neck all from carbon fiber)
- TBX (through body experimental); it is rumoured, that only 11 four-string, 85 five-string and 90 6-string basses were made before year 2000 - production has started again
- Quantum SPi bass (SPi = integrated, bolt-on neck; basic version has two EMG pickups, custom options include exotic wood tops and electronics; 5-string has 17, 19 or 21.5 mm bridge spacing options)
- M-92 (Sweet Spot bass = single EMG pick up, bolt-on neck, pickguard; in production since 1992, Turbo model added a second pickup next to the bridge; 4, 5 and 6 string models,)
- Sonic Hammer (like M-92, but bartolini pick-up and electronics, quilt top, no pickguard)
- Genesis Bass (bolt-on neck with carbon core, wood sides and fretboard; co-designed with Michael Tobias)
- Modulus VJ Bass (Vintage J, bolt-on, active or passive electronics)
- Funk Unlimited (formerly Sonic Hammer and the Flea Bass, bolt-on neck; also available as chambered & lightweight RevOLite version)
- Funk Persuasion (single pick up, passive electronics, bolt-on neck; also available as chambered & lightweight RevOLite version)
- Vertex (single pick-up, bolt-on)

=== Formerly ===
- Modulus Genesis I Electric Guitar (G1)
- Modulus Genesis I Electric Guitar with tremolo (G1T)
- Modulus Genesis II Electric Guitar (G2)
- Modulus Genesis II Electric Guitar with tremolo (G2T)
- Modulus Genesis III Electric Guitar (G3)
- Modulus Genesis III Electric Guitar (G3T)
- Modulus Genesis III Electric Guitar Carved Top (G3CT)
- Modulus Genesis III Electric Guitar Semi Hollow (G3SH)
- Modulus Genesis III Electric Guitar Full Hollow (G3FH)

== Notable players ==
Musicians that play/have played Modulus instruments are:

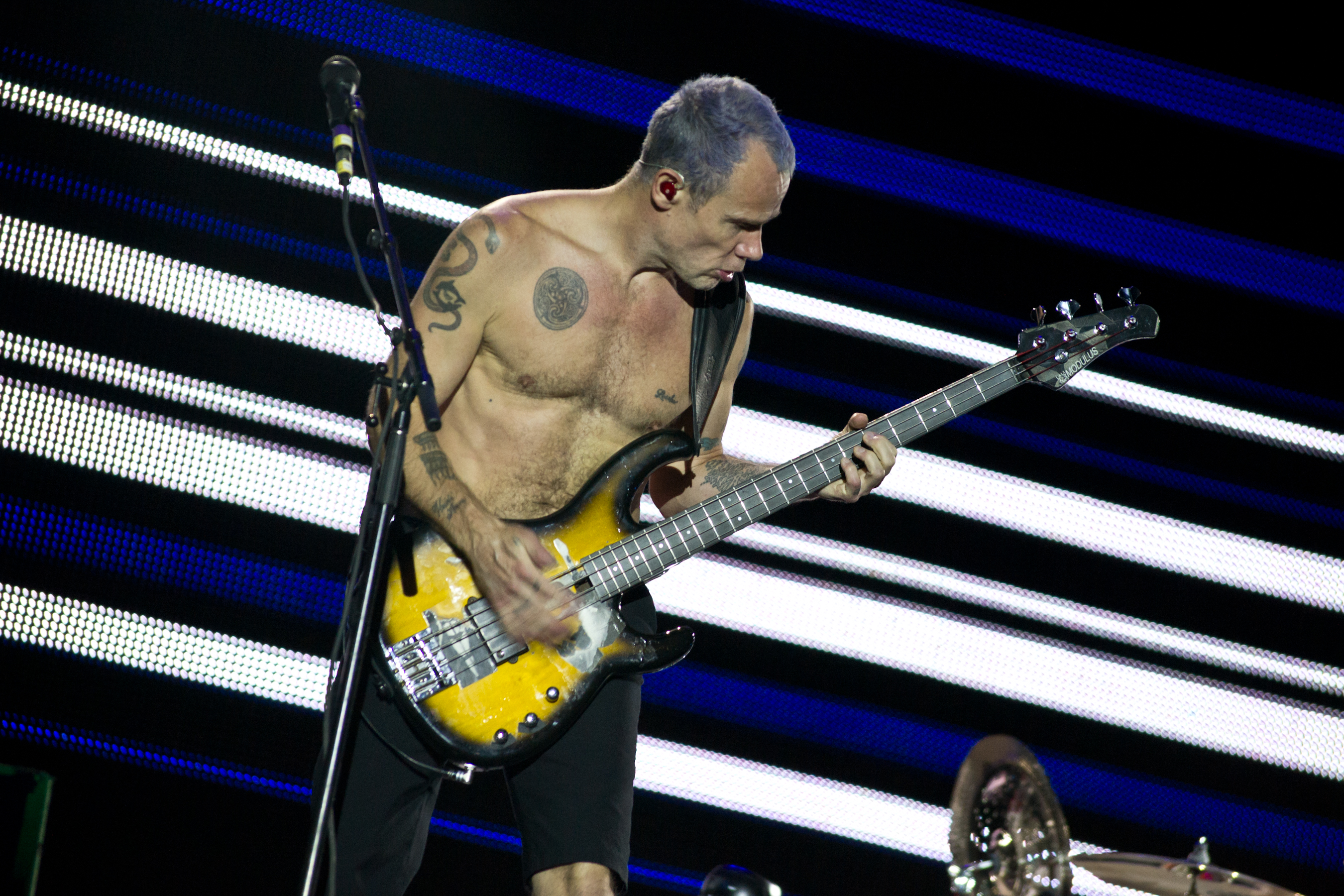
Red Hot Chili Peppers's Flea with his Modulus Funk Unlimited

- Steve Rodby - Pat Metheny
- David Ellefson - Megadeth
- Flea - Red Hot Chili Peppers
- Phil Lesh - Grateful Dead
- Darryl Jenifer - Bad Brains
- Bob Weir - Grateful Dead
- Jack Casady - Jefferson Airplane - Hot Tuna
- Oteil Burbridge - Allman Brothers Band
- Stefan Lessard - Dave Matthews Band
- Me'shell Ndegeocello
- Mike Gordon - Phish
- Dave Schools - Widespread Panic
- Jeff Ament - Pearl Jam
- Pete Sears - Rod Stewart - Long John Baldry - Jefferson Starship - David Nelson Band
- Chad Urmston and Pete Francis Heimbold - Dispatch
- Alex Webster - Cannibal Corpse - Hate Eternal
- Wil-Dog Abers - Ozomatli
- Futoshi Uehara - Maximum the Hormone
- Tad Kinchla - Blues Traveler
- Alphonso Johnson
- Divinity Roxx
- Christopher Rapkin
