= Namaste Trump =

2020 visit of U.S. President Donald Trump to India

- Date: 24 February 2020 – 25 February 2020; 6 years ago
- Time: 36 hours
- Duration: 2 days
- Location: Narendra Modi Stadium (then Motera Stadium), Ahmedabad, India
- Theme: Traditional
- Organized by: Government of India
- Participants: 100,000–125,000

Namaste Trump (styled Namaste नमस्ते TRUMP) was a tour event held on 24 and 25 February 2020 in India. It was the inaugural visit of the President of the United States Donald Trump and his family to India. A rally event of the same name was held in Ahmedabad, Gujarat, and was the highlight of the tour, as a response to the "Howdy Modi" event held in Houston, Texas, in September 2019. The Motera Stadium (now known as Narendra Modi Stadium) hosted U.S. President Trump and his family along with Indian Prime Minister Narendra Modi. An attendance of over 100,000 people was reported, with some speculating an attendance as high as 125,000. The tour was originally named "Kem Chho Trump" but was renamed by the Government of India to promote Indian nationalism over regionalism. (Note: "Kem Chho" means "Hello" in Gujarati, while "Namaste" is the standard greeting in Hindi)

== Main event ==
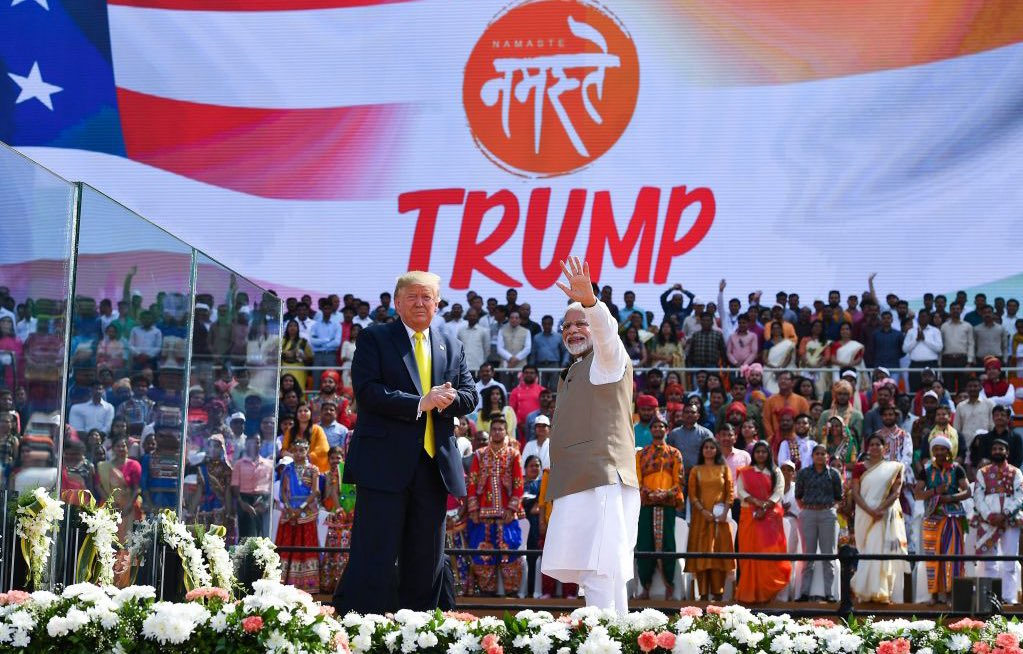
US President Donald Trump (left) and Indian Prime Minister Narendra Modi (right) at Namaste Trump rally in Narendra Modi Stadium

The main event at the stadium was the highlight of the President's visit to India, serving as a platform for the US President and Indian Prime Minister to display their friendly relationship with each other. While initial reports suggested that Trump would inaugurate the Motera Stadium, it was later disregarded as "speculation and assumption".

== Taj Mahal visit ==
Trump also visited the Taj Mahal in Agra, Uttar Pradesh on the same day. In Agra, the Chief Minister of Uttar Pradesh, Yogi Adityanath welcomed the President and the First Lady on their arrival at Agra Airport. An exposition event with 3000 cultural artists showcasing the art and culture of various regions in India also took place. The Trump family then visited the Taj Mahal informally, with no official personnel except the tour guide, and protective personnel such as the United States Secret Service and India's National Security Guard.

== Banquet and trade deals ==
After visiting the Taj Mahal, the President and his family headed towards New Delhi, to stay at the ITC Maurya, which was heavily surrounded by security personnel from both countries. They also attended the dinner banquet hosted by the President of India Ram Nath Kovind. The next day, the First Lady visited Sarvodaya Vidyalaya Senior Secondary Co-Educational school in Nanakpura, South Delhi. President Trump and Prime Minister Modi addressed common issues such as 5G connectivity, trade deals, and signed a US$3 billion defense deal.

== Preparation ==
Ahead of Trump's visit to Ahmedabad, the Gujarat state government had built a new wall. The construction of this wall was protested by social workers claiming that it was created for hiding slums. However, officials denied this and said that it was built due to security reasons. In order to keep all roads and walls around the airport spotless from the "red liquid" spat out by the paan (transl. betel leaf) consumers during the Trump visit, the health department of the Ahmedabad Municipal Corporation sealed paan shops near the airport. The Uttar Pradesh government, too, cleaned up the city of Agra and released 500 cusecs of water into the Yamuna river to improve its "environmental condition" ahead of visit.

== Reception ==
Video footage from the Namaste Trump event

Trump's visit coincided with 2020 Delhi riots, with some Indian politicians and political commentators accusing the rioters of tarnishing the country's image, and some criticising the organisation of the event. The visit was criticised by the Indian National Congress, which is the main opposition to the ruling Bharatiya Janata Party. They claimed it to be "extravaganza" and advised the government to use this opportunity to discuss key issues. Further, the leader of the Congress, Priyanka Gandhi, demanded to know which government ministry was funding the private welcoming committee with the estimated amount of ₹100 crore for organising the Ahmedabad event. Earlier, India's Ministry of External Affairs had stated that a private organisation, Donald Trump Abhinandan Samiti (transl. Donald Trump Welcoming Committee), was responsible for organising the Ahmedabad event.

The success of the event was called into question again in 2025-26, when President Trump imposed 50% trade tariffs on India for buying oil from Russia. Critics asserted the event had failed to strengthen US-India ties.

== See also ==
- Howdy Modi
- India–United States relations
