= 2020 Delhi riots =

2020 series of riots in Delhi, India

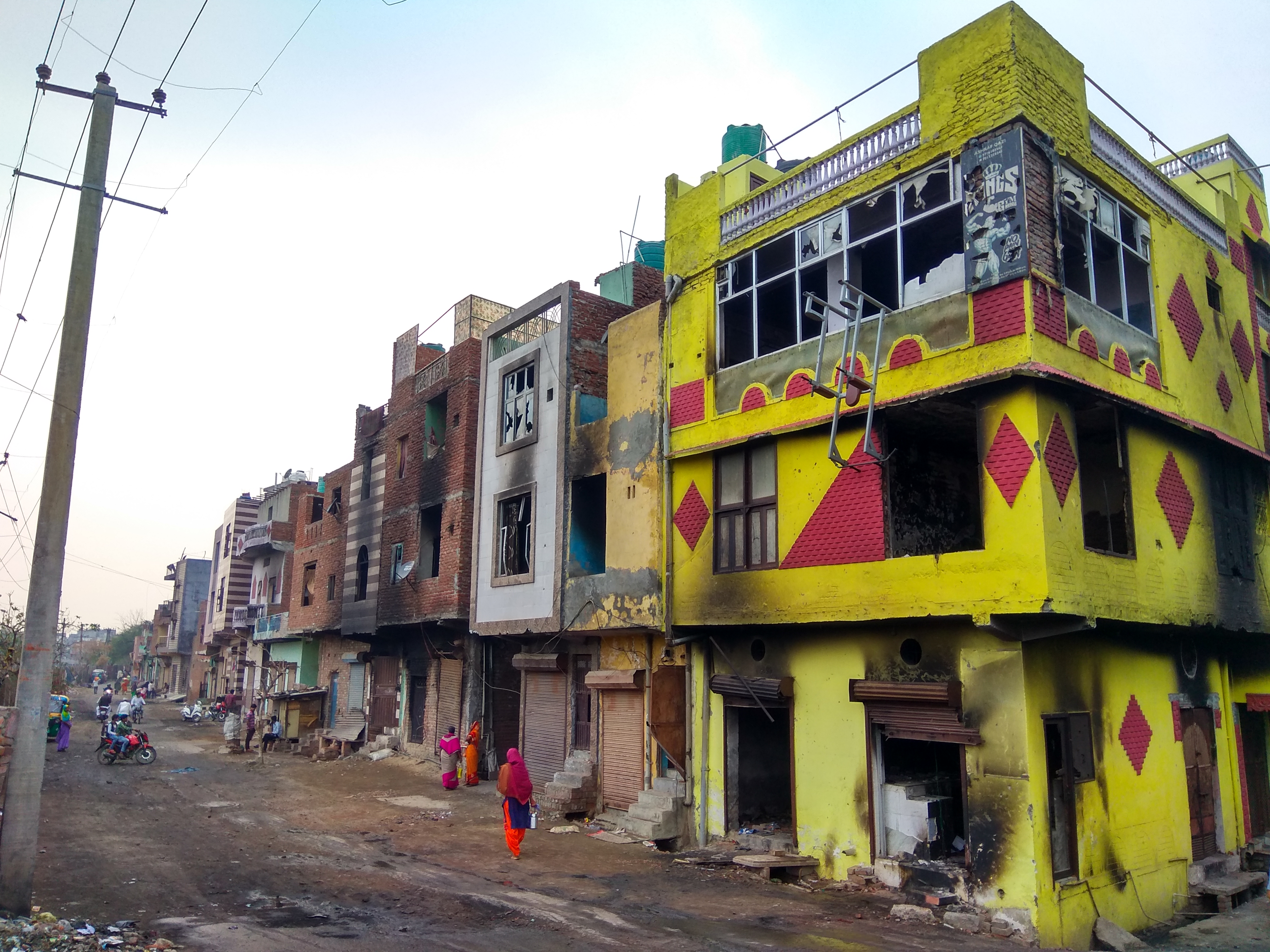
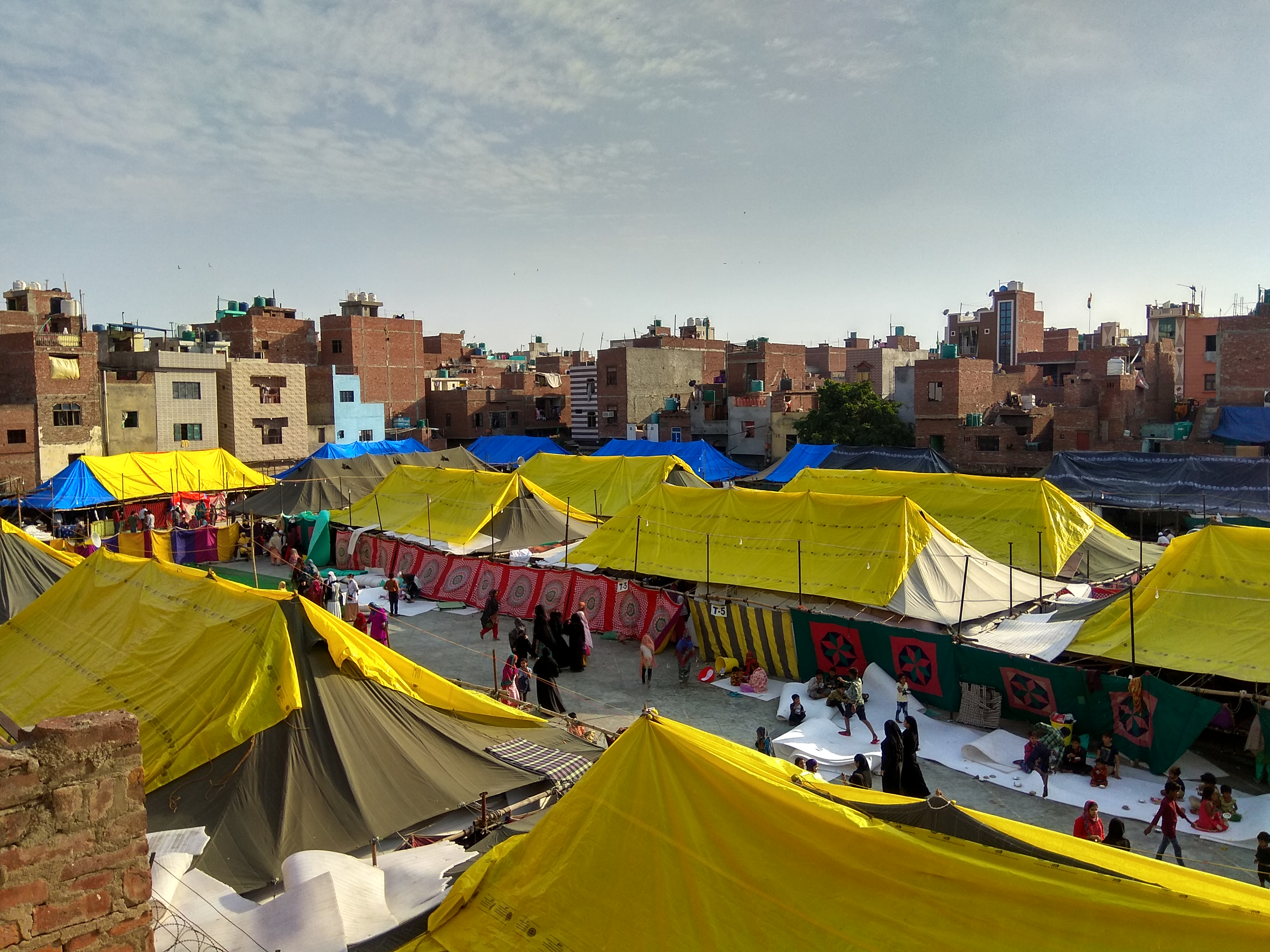
- (top) Muslim homes and businesses were set on fire during the rioting in Shiv Vihar, Delhi. (Note: The following reference to a published source that includes a similar photo supports description in caption and provides additional context. This is not the photo published by that source.) (bottom) A relief camp at Eidgah in Mustafabad, Delhi set up by the Government of Delhi (Note: The Government of Delhi is different from the Government of India.) and the Muslim Waqf board, with beds for 800 women and 700 men, and with doctors from St Stephens Hospital and Holy Family Hospital volunteering. (Note: The following reference to a published source supports description in caption and provides additional context. This photo was not published by that source.)
- Location: 28.682°N 77.274°E; North East Delhi, India
- Date: 23 February 2020 – 29 February 2020 (6 days)
- Target: Muslims in Delhi
- Attack type: Rioting; arson; burglary; shooting
- Deaths: 53: 2 unidentified; 36 Muslims; 15 Hindus
- Injuries: 200+
- Motive: Preventing Citizenship Amendment Act protests; Ethnic and religious persecution; Hindutva
- Convicted: 2,200 (including detained)

The 2020 Delhi riots, or North East Delhi riots, were multiple waves of bloodshed, property destruction, and rioting in North East Delhi, India, beginning on 23 February 2020 and brought about chiefly by Hindu mobs attacking Muslims. Of the 53 people killed, two-thirds were Muslims who were shot, slashed with repeated blows, or set on fire. The dead also included over a dozen Hindus, who were shot or assaulted. Over a week after the violence had ended, hundreds of wounded were languishing in inadequately staffed medical facilities and corpses were being found in open drains. By mid-March many Muslims had remained missing.

Muslims were marked as targets for violence. In order to have their religion ascertained, Muslim males—who unlike Hindus are commonly circumcised—were at times forced to remove their lower garments before being brutalised. Among the injuries recorded in one hospital were lacerated genitals. The properties destroyed were disproportionately Muslim-owned and included four mosques, which were set ablaze by rioters. By the end of February, many Muslims had left these neighbourhoods. Even in areas of Delhi untouched by the violence, some Muslims had left for their ancestral villages, fearful for their personal safety in India's capital.

The riots had their origin in Jaffrabad, in North East Delhi, where a sit-in by women against India's Citizenship (Amendment) Act, 2019, had been in progress on a stretch of the Seelampur–Jaffrabad–Maujpur road, blocking traffic. On 23 February 2020, a leader of the ruling Hindu nationalist Bharatiya Janata Party, Kapil Mishra, called for Delhi Police to clear the roads, failing which he threatened to "hit the streets". After Mishra's ultimatum, violence erupted. Initially, Hindu and Muslim attacks were equally lethal. Most deaths were attributed to gunfire. By 25 February 2020, the balance had shifted. Rioters wearing helmets and carrying sticks, stones, swords or pistols, and the saffron flags of Hindu nationalism entered Muslim neighbourhoods, as the police stood by. Chants were heard of "Jai Shri Ram" ("Victory to Lord Rama"), a religious slogan favoured by prime minister Narendra Modi's party. In the neighbourhood of Shiv Vihar, Hindu rioters attacked Muslim houses and businesses for three days, often firebombing them with cooking gas cylinders and gutting them without resistance or intervention from the police. In some instances, Muslims countered perceived threats by returning the violence; on the 25th a Muslim mob approached a Hindu neighbourhood throwing stones and Molotov cocktails and firing guns. During this time, stories were also told of Sikh and Hindu families coming to the aid of besieged Muslims; in some neighbourhoods, the religious communities cooperated in protecting themselves from violence.

The Indian government swiftly characterised the violence as spontaneous. The Delhi Police, which is directly overseen by India's central government, moved into the area in strength on 26 February after the Delhi High Court had ordered it to help remove injured victims to hospitals. India's national security advisor, Ajit Doval, visited the area; the prime minister, Narendra Modi, made an appeal for peace on Twitter. The Delhi police were accused by the affected citizens, eyewitnesses, human rights organizations and Muslim leaders around the world of falling short in protecting Muslims. Videos showed police acting in a coordinated manner against Muslims, on occasion purposefully helping Hindu gangs. Witnesses said some police officers joined the attacks on Muslims.

After the violence had abated in the thickly-settled mixed Hindu–Muslim neighbourhoods of North East Delhi, some Hindu organisations continued to parade alleged Hindu victims of Muslim violence in an attempt to reshape the accounting of events and to further inflame hostility towards Muslims. About 1,000 Muslims sought shelter in a relief camp on the fringes of Delhi. Gangs of Hindus appeared in several Muslim neighbourhoods in the days preceding the Hindu festival of Holi, celebrated in 2020 on 9 March, to scare Muslims into abandoning their homes. In the midst of prevailing anti-Muslim attitudes, senior lawyers in Delhi were not accepting cases on behalf of the riot victims. Among Hindus and Muslims who continued to live in their neighbourhoods, the violence created potentially long-living divisions. For at least two weeks after the rioting, they avoided each other during the day and at night blocked their lanes with barriers.

== Background ==
Protests began across India in December 2019 in response to the passage of the Citizenship (Amendment) Act (CAA), which allows fast-tracked naturalisation for immigrants from Pakistan, Bangladesh and Afghanistan belonging to six religions — Hinduism, Sikhism, Christianity, Zoroastrianism, Jainism and Buddhism — but not Islam. The Act was seen as discriminatory to Muslims and threatening to their existence in India when combined with the anticipated National Register of Citizens (NRC).

Several anti-CAA protests were held in New Delhi. Some protesters burned vehicles and pelted stones at security forces. In Shaheen Bagh, protesters blocked roads, which led to a traffic jam.

The Delhi Legislative Assembly election was held on 8 February 2020, in which the Bharatiya Janata Party (BJP) was defeated by the Aam Aadmi Party (AAP); widespread usage of incendiary slogans by BJP equating the protesters to anti-national elements and asking for them to be shot were reported. (Note: At a rally in Delhi, a Union Cabinet minister shouted Desh ke ġaddāroṉ ko ("What's to be done with the traitors to the nation?") and the crowd screamed back, Goli māro sāloṉ ko ("Shoot the bastards!").) Delhi BJP chief, Manoj Tiwari, has since attributed hate speech by fellow party-candidate Kapil Mishra (who coined the slogans) as a cause of the BJP defeat.

On 22 February, around 500 to 1,000 protesters, including women, began a sit-in protest near the Jaffrabad metro station. The protest blocked a stretch of Seelampur–Jaffrabad–Maujpur road, as well as the entry and exit to the metro station. According to the protesters, the sit-in was in solidarity with the Bharat Bandh called by the Bhim Army, which was scheduled to begin on 23 February. Police and paramilitary personnel were deployed at the site.

== Timeline ==
=== 23 February and incitement ===
On 23 February between 3.30 p.m. and 4 p.m., BJP leader Kapil Mishra and his supporters reached a protest site at Maujpur Chowk "to give an answer to Jaffrabad [blockade]". Mishra then spoke out in a rally against the CAA protesters (Note: Previously, on 17 December 2019, violence occurred during the CAA-protests in the Seelampur area, in North East Delhi. On 3 January 2020, DCP Surya told media that adequate security personnel and proper security arrangements were in place in the Seelampur area and no further gatherings and violence were expected.) and threatened to take matters into his own hands if the police failed to disperse the protesters from the Jaffrabad and Chand Bagh areas in three days' time. This has been widely reported to be the major inciting factor; however, Mishra rejects the characterisation that he did anything wrong.

At approximately 4 p.m., protesters were reported to have hurled stones at the pro-CAA gathering at Maujpur Chowk and near a temple. Between 9 and 11 p.m., clashes broke out between the anti-CAA and pro-CAA demonstrators in Karawal Nagar, Maujpur Chowk, Babarpur and Chand Bagh. Vehicles were gutted and shops were destroyed. The police used baton charges and tear gas to disperse the crowd. Seven hundred emergency calls were made to the police control room that day.

=== 24 February ===
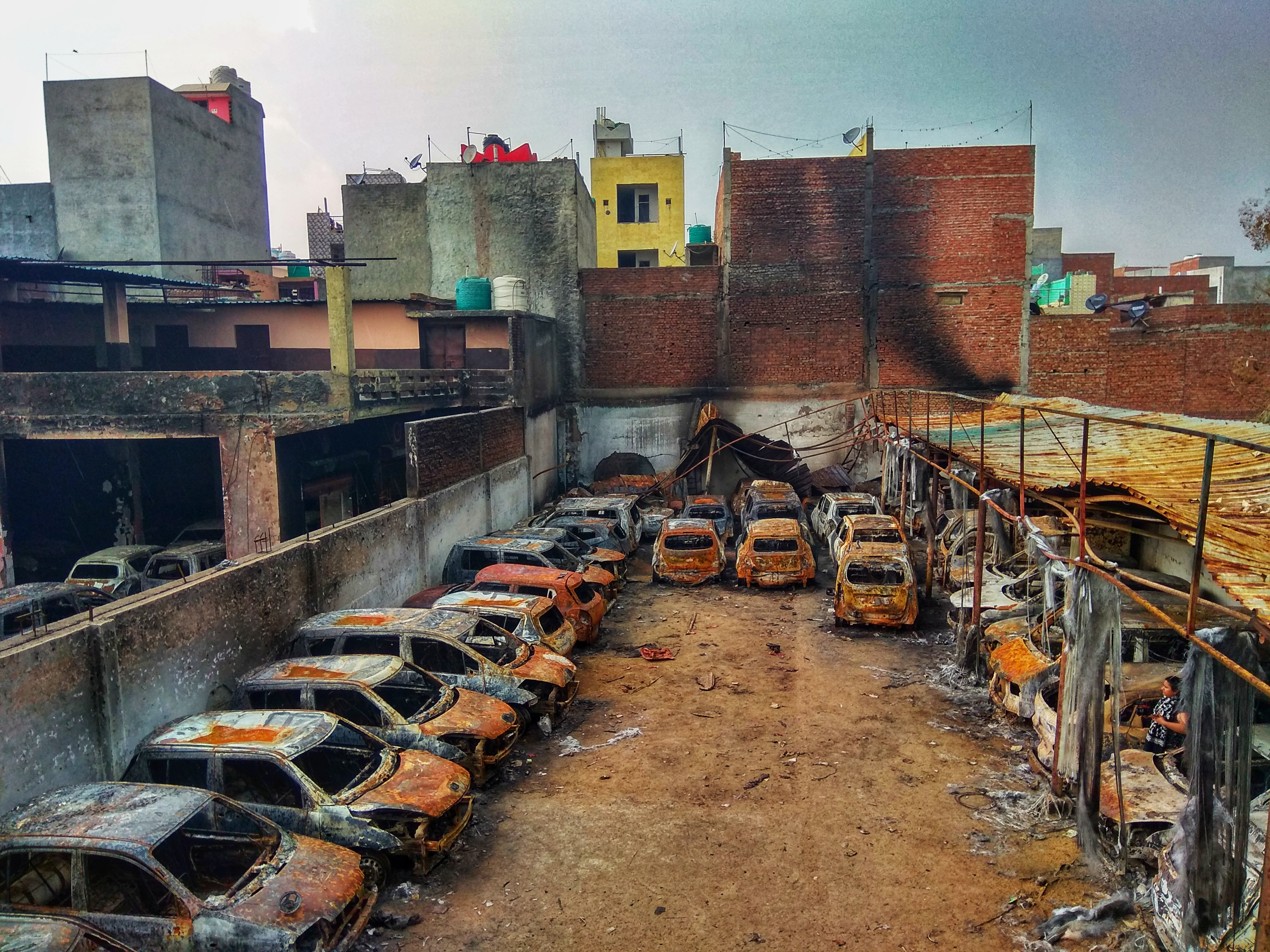
Charred cars in North East Delhi after mobs set fire to the area (Note: The following reference to a published source that includes a similar photo is offered solely for context. This is not the photo published by that source.)

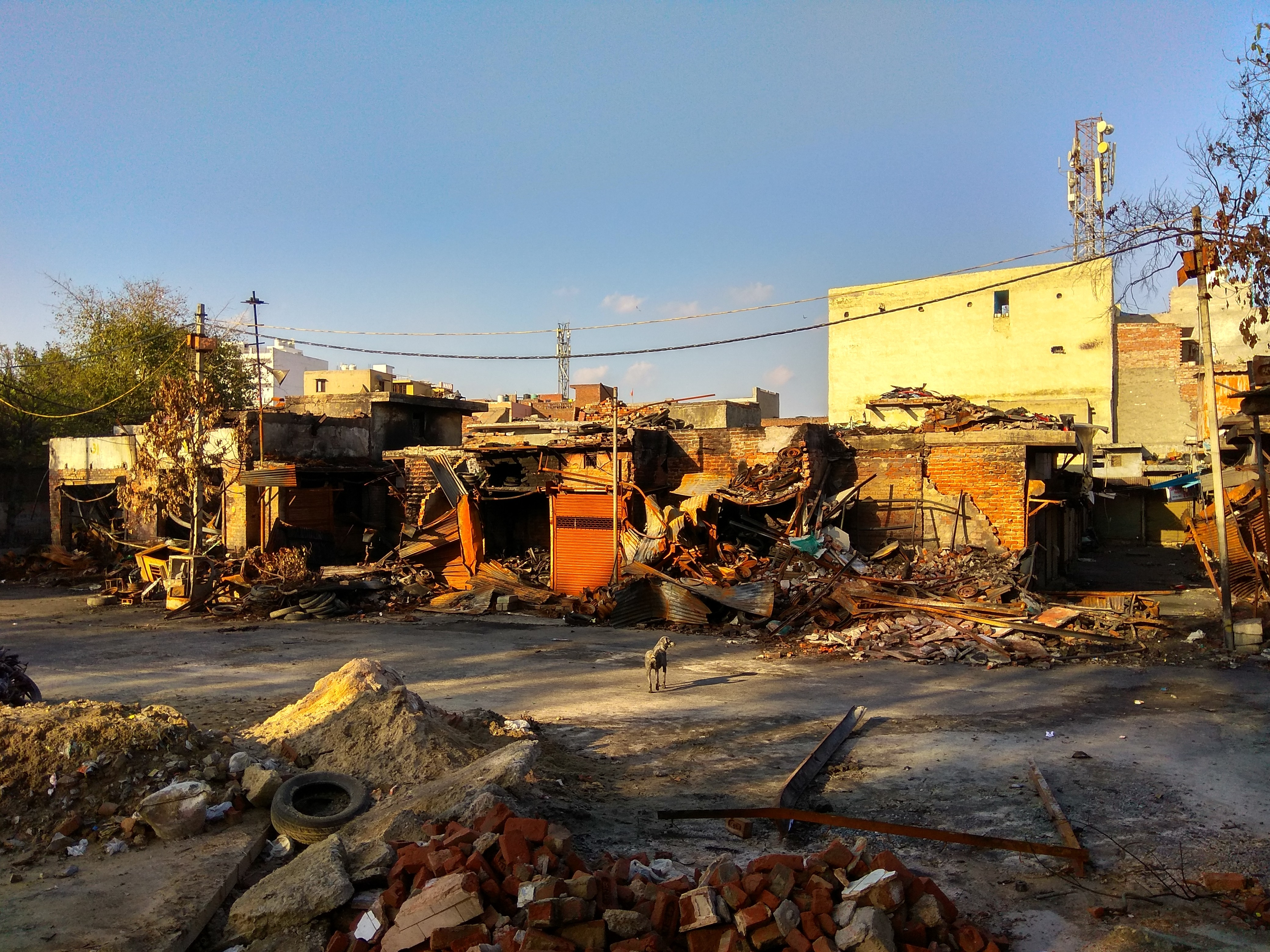
Gokulpuri Tyre Market after mobs set fire to the shops (Note: The following reference to a published source that includes a similar photo is offered solely for context. This is not the photo published by that source.)

On the morning of 24 February, pro-CAA groups arrived at an anti-CAA protest site at Jaffrabad and refused to leave until the anti-CAA protesters left the area. At around 12:30 p.m., protesters wearing masks and waving swords clashed with the police force. By afternoon, violent clashes broke out in several areas of North East Delhi, including in the Gokulpuri and Kardampuri areas. There was heavy stone pelting and vandalism of property. The police used tear gas and lathi charge against the protesters in the Chand Bagh area, but the protesters retaliated by throwing stones at the police. A head constable, Ratan Lal, died of a bullet injury in this clash. (Note: Initial reports said that Ratan Lal had died of a head injury after being hit by a stone. However, the autopsy report said that a bullet was found in his body.)

In Bhajanpura, in afternoon a group numbering around 2000 attacked a petrol pump, chanting slogans of Āzādī (transl. 'Freedom') and carrying petrol bombs, sticks and weapons. They attacked the owner and employees of the petrol pump with sticks, burning vehicles and petrol tanks after looting available cash.

Violence was also reported from the areas of Seelampur, Jaffrabad, Maujpur, Kardampuri, Babarpur, Gokulpuri and Shivpuri. Section 144 (ban on assembly) was imposed in all the affected areas but to little effect. In Jaffrabad, a man, allegedly linked with the anti-CAA side, opened fire at the police, before being arrested days later in Uttar Pradesh.

In Shiv Vihar, in the afternoon, several shops and homes owned by Hindus were torched by a Muslim mob. Later, mutilated bodies of workers were recovered from the site. A massive parking lot with 170 cars was burned by a mob. In the evening around 8:30 p.m., a tyre market (predominantly owned by Muslims) was set on fire with the screaming of Jai Shri Ram being heard. Later that night, at around 10:30 p.m., a mob beat a Hindu man and his elderly father travelling on a scooter with sticks, stones and swords while screaming "Allahu akbar". The man died on the spot. On that day, five people died including a police constable and four civilians.

3,500 emergency calls were made to the police control room that day. The Delhi Fire Service stated that it had attended 45 calls from areas in northeast Delhi and three firemen were injured, on 24 February. While attending calls, a fire engine was attacked with stones, while another fire engine was set on fire by rioters.

=== 25 February ===
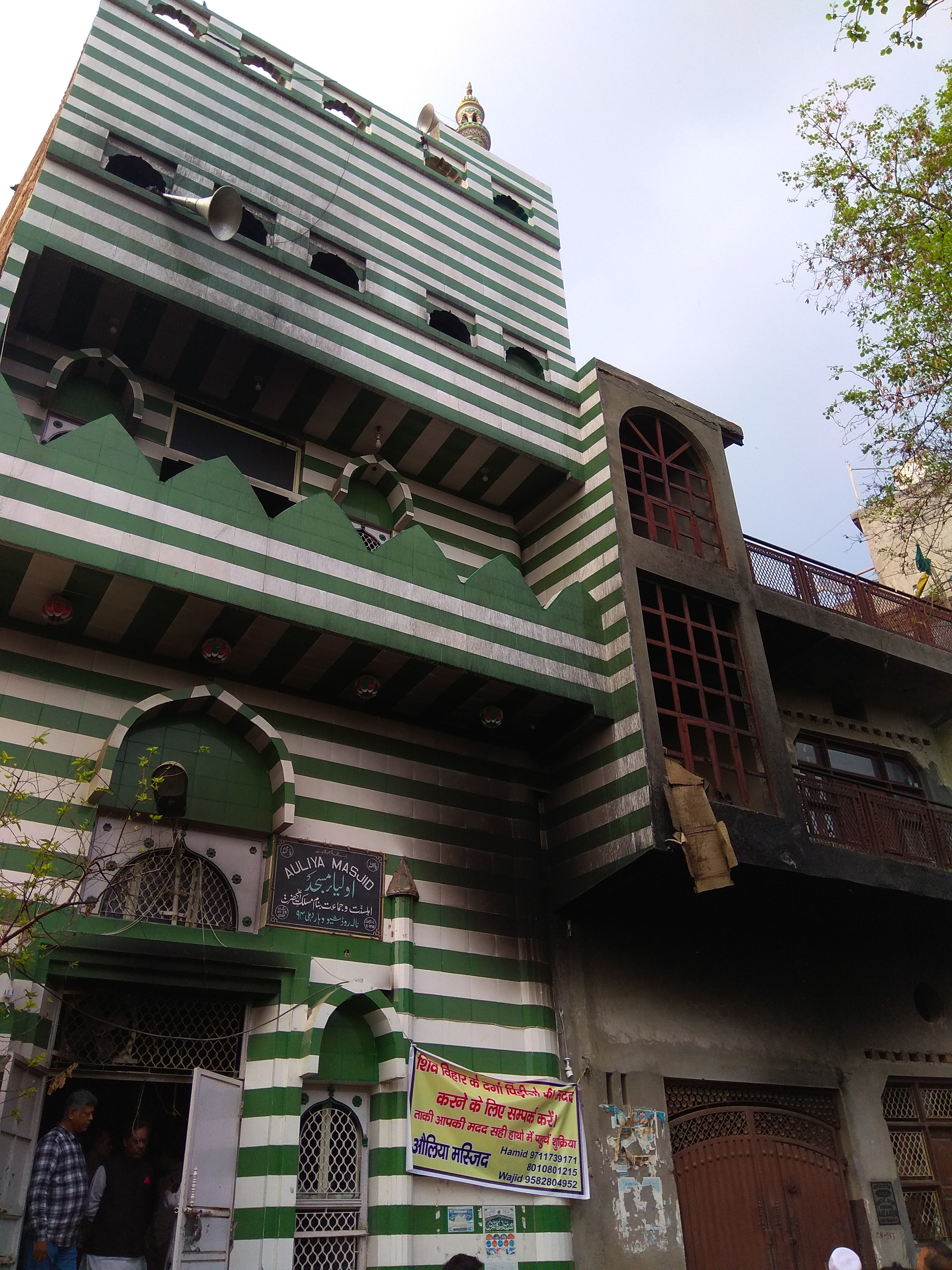
The Auliya Mosque in Shiv Vihar was firebombed with gas cylinders. (Note: The following reference to a published source is offered solely for context. This photo was not published by that source.)

On 25 February, stone pelting was reported from Maujpur, Brahampuri and other neighbouring areas. Rapid Action Force were deployed in the worst affected areas. It was a full-blown riot with intense religious sloganeering and violence from both sides.

In Ashok Nagar, a mosque was vandalized and a Hanuman flag was placed on one of the minarets of the mosque. It was also reported that the prayer mats of the mosque were burnt and pages torn from the Quran were strewn outside the mosque. A mob shouting the slogans Jai Śrī Rām (transl. "Hail Lord Rama") and Hindūō̃ kā Hindustān (transl. "India for Hindus") marched around the mosque before setting it on fire and looting adjacent shops and houses. According to local residents, the attackers did not belong to the area. After the first wave of violence by rioters, the police evacuated Muslim residents and took them to the police station. While the residents were away, a second mosque in Ashok Nagar and a third in Brijpuri were also torched along with a three-storey house and eight shops in the vicinity; the rioters could not be identified. Another mosque was vandalised in Gokulpuri.

At 3 p.m. in Durgapuri, Hindu and Muslim mobs clashed, pelting stones and shooting at each other. The rioters sported tilaka on their foreheads, and shouted religious slogans whilst shops and vehicles belonging exclusively to Muslims were torched. Police were not present initially in the area and arrived almost an hour later.

At Gamri extension, a Hindu mob attacked a lane, and an 85-year-old woman was burnt to death when her house was set on fire. In Karawal Nagar, acid was thrown by protesters on the paramilitary personnel, who were deployed in the area to maintain law and order. A Muslim man was shot and burnt to death by a mob in Shiv Vihar, with cries of Jai Shri Ram being heard. People wielding sticks and iron rods were reported to be roaming streets in the areas of Bhajanpura, Chand Bagh and Karawal Nagar localities.

By 9:30 p.m., it was reported that 13 people died due to violence. Among the injured, more than 70 people suffered gunshot injuries. At 10 p.m., shoot at sight orders were given to police in the riot-affected area.

The dead body of a staffer from the Intelligence Bureau (IB) at Chanakyapuri, was found in a drain in Jaffrabad, a day after he went missing. He had been employed at the IB as a trainee driver. The circumstances leading to his death were then under investigation, with a lot of confusion regarding them. According to a post-mortem report, he was repeatedly stabbed, leading to his death.

7,500 emergency calls were made to the police control room throughout the day, the highest of the week.

=== 26 February ===
The National Security Advisor of India, Ajit Doval, visited violence-affected areas of North East Delhi in the evening. However, reports of violence, arson and mob lynching emerged from Karawal Nagar, Maujpur and Bhajanpura later that night.

1,500 emergency calls were made to the police control room that day. Complaints of delayed post-mortem reports were heard from several hospitals while witnesses and affected individuals who claimed to be civilians gave statements. Some of them blamed Kapil Mishra for the riots while one individual stated that a mob attacked them with stones and swords while chanting the Takbir.

=== 27 to 29 February ===
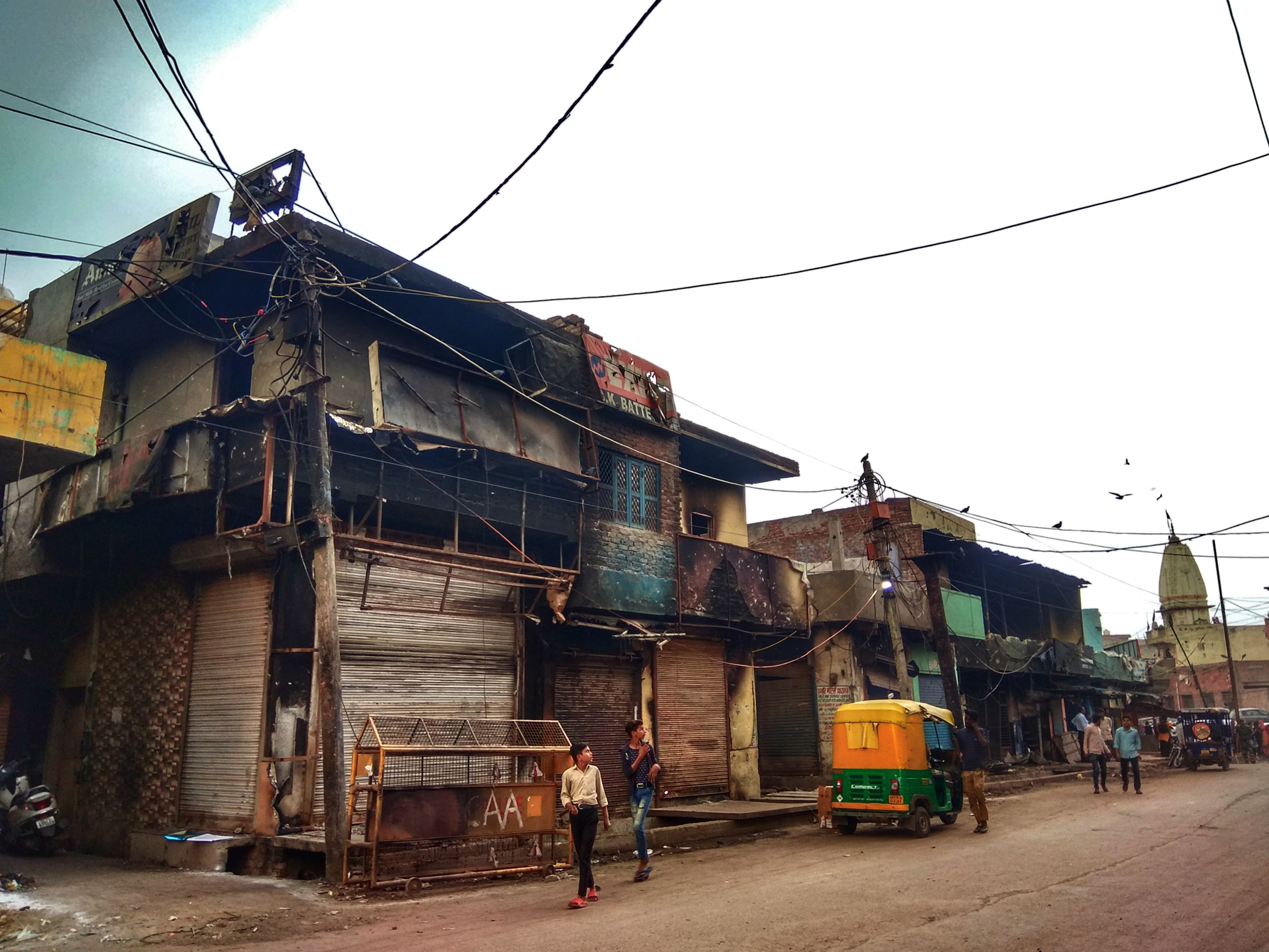
Burnt shops at Shiv Vihar (Note: The following reference to a published source that includes the same photo is offered solely for context.)

On 27 February in Shiv Vihar, between 7 a.m. and 9 a.m., clashes were reported. Three injured persons were reported, one of whom had bullet wounds. A godown, two shops, and a motorcycle were torched. The next day a 60-year-old rag picker, who had stepped out of home assuming the situation had normalized, was attacked and died on way to the hospital due to head injuries. On 29 February with no fresh cases of violence reported to the police on the day, the situation was said to be returning to normal with some shops reopening. Thirteen cases were registered against people posting provocative content on social media. In the Welcome area, one shop was set on fire.

== Attacks on journalists ==
Several incidents of mobs attacking journalists were reported during the riots. A journalist of JK 24x7 News was shot by what he thought were anti-CAA protestors on 25 February while reporting in the Maujpur area. Two journalists of NDTV along with a cameraman were attacked by the mob while they were recording the torching of a mosque in the area. One of the journalists sustained severe injuries. A journalist involved in the same incident had to intervene and convince the mob that the journalists were Hindus to save them from further assault.

On 25 February, a photojournalist for The Times of India was heckled by the Hindu Sena members while taking pictures of a building that had been set on fire. The group tried to put a "tilak on his forehead" claiming that it will "make his job easier" as he could then be identified as a Hindu by the rioters. They questioned his intentions of taking pictures of the building on fire and further threatened to remove his pants to reveal that he is not circumcised, as evidence of being a Hindu. The reporter was later approached by another rioter who demanded him to prove his religion.

Several journalists shared their experience with rioters on Twitter. A journalist of Times Now tweeted that she was attacked by pro-CAA and right-wing protesters. She said that she had to plead with the mob, who were carrying stones and sticks, to escape from the site. Journalists of Reuters, India Today, and CNN-News18 too stated that they were assaulted.

The Hindustan Times reported that a motorcycle, which belonged to one of its photographers who was documenting the violence in Karawal Nagar, was set on fire by a masked mob. After torching the motorcycle, the mob threatened, assaulted him and seized the memory card in his camera. They asked for his official identity card and took a photograph of it before letting him leave.

The Editors Guild of India issued a statement on 25 February expressing concern about the attacks on journalists as an assault on freedom of the press in India. They urged the Home Ministry and the Delhi Police to investigate the incidents and bring the perpetrators to justice.

== Interfaith solidarity ==
ThePrint journalists, who covered the incidents, reported that the people of the localities were confident that their neighbours did not engage in violence against them. Rather they blamed the "outsiders". The neighbourhood between Jaffrabad and Maujpur, which has a mixed population of Hindus and Muslims, demonstrated unity by guarding one another and barricading the gate to prevent outside mobs from entering and destroying the communal harmony that exists there. In the area of Mustafabad, Hindus and Muslims joined to keep guard to prevent outside rioters from entering the area.

Some Hindu families worked to protect their Muslim friends and neighbours amidst the riots by inviting them into their homes for a few days until the riots calmed down. A local Hindu rescued his Muslim friends from their burning house, suffering 70% burns while doing so. In the area of Chand Bagh, some Muslims visited their Hindu neighbours and assured their safety. At the Mandir Masjid Marg of Noor-e-Ilahi, Muslims gathered around Hanuman Mandir, the Hindu temple, to protect it from being damaged while Hindus did the same for Azizya Masjid, a mosque in the area. A Sikh father-son duo rescued around seventy Muslims from a mosque and a madrasa that were surrounded by a mob, by transporting them to safety on their motorcycle, giving safe passage to two children at a time. Amidst the rioting, the Sikh community allowed those seeking shelter into the gurdwara.

Both Hindus and Muslims comforted one another and mourned the loss of their kin who were killed by the rioters. On 1 March, Muslim and Hindu residents of Jaffrabad organised a peace march together. Later that week, Anil Joseph Thomas Couto, the Catholic Christian archbishop of the Roman Catholic Archdiocese of Delhi appealed "for peace and non-violence" and clergy from the Christian, Hindu, Muslim, Sikh and Jain faiths gathered in front of the Sacred Heart Cathedral, New Delhi, to pray in solidarity.

== Handling by emergency services ==
=== Delhi Police ===
The Delhi Police's ability to maintain law and order and bring the peace back in riot-affected areas was questioned by multiple sources. The police took no action even though they were present when the violence escalated to murder. They remained lax in deploying policemen on 23 February, when multiple intelligence reports requested more forces to prevent the tense situation —created by Mishra's speech— from escalating further. Victims of the riot reported that the police did not respond promptly when called, claiming that the officers were busy. Other reports suggested that the police encouraged rioters and physically attacked residents of riot-affected areas, going on to shoot people randomly. The police deny these assertions.

A video shared on social media on 26 February showed a group of men being assaulted by the police as they lay on the ground, forcibly singing the national anthem of India and Vande Mataram on the demands of the policemen. The families of the men claimed that they were detained in the lockup for two days and beaten further. One of them, Mohammad Faizan, was admitted in the neurosurgery wing of LNJP Hospital and died on 29 February from critical gunshot wounds. Another was reported to have suffered serious injuries.

The lack of prompt response by the police may be attributed to the large police force deployed to line the roads for the visit of the United States President Donald Trump on 24 and 25 February. The police had reportedly informed the Ministry of Home Affairs of the shortfall of policeman available for immediately controlling the violence, but this was denied by the Ministry.

When the Delhi High Court bench, on 27 February, ordered the Delhi Police to file FIRs against the people whose speeches triggered the riots, the police and the government remarked that they had consciously not done so, citing that arresting them would not restore immediate peace. They further informed the court that they would need more time to investigate the matter.

When a team of lawyers visited Jagatpuri police station to visit the anti-CAA protestors detained by the police, they were reportedly abused by police personnel. The lawyers then wrote to the Delhi commissioner of police, demanding action against the officer who assaulted them.

=== Delhi Health Services ===
The Jan Swasthya Abhiyaan (JSA), a public health advocacy group, compiled a report on the information gathered by their volunteers working in the hospitals during the riots. The report, titled The Role of Health Systems in Responding to Communal Violence in Delhi and released on 2 March, alleged that doctors had harassed the victims by referring to them as terrorists, and had asked victims if they knew the full forms of "NRC" and "CAA". The report documented instances of negligence, denying victims treatment in some cases, while disregarding the safety of patients in others. Multiple cases were reportedly rejected for not having the required medico-legal case documentation. It was also alleged that the doctors did not provide detailed reports of the injuries and autopsies to the victims and their families.

The report indicated that citizens had grown fearful of government services such as ambulances and government hospitals, with victims taking private vehicles to go to private hospitals, due to the treatment and abuse that they had received from the police. This problem compounded the existing issues of the mobs not allowing ambulances near the riot-affected areas. In some areas, primary health centres and hospitals remained closed throughout the riots, either due to the violence or due to lack of medical facilities available at the grassroots level even before the riots began. Families of the victims also reported delayed post-mortem reports from several hospitals.

== Response and reactions ==
=== Response by the government ===
On 24 February 2020, the Ministry of Home Affairs stated that the violence appeared orchestrated to coincide with President Donald Trump's February 24–25, 2020 visit to India. The Ministry also refused to bring in the Army to control the riots and stated that the number of central forces and policemen on the ground was adequate. More than 6,000 police and paramilitary personnel were deployed in the area.

On 25 February the Chief Minister of Delhi, Arvind Kejriwal stated that the Delhi Police, despite its efforts, had been unable to control the violence and requested the Army's assistance in stopping the violence as the number of deaths climbed to 23.

=== Home Ministry's meeting ===
On the morning of 25 February 2020, the Chief Minister Kejriwal chaired an urgent meeting of all party MLAs from the violence-hit areas and senior officials. Several MLAs raised concerns on the lack of deployment of enough policemen. The concerns were raised by Kejriwal in the subsequent meeting chaired by Home Minister Shah and attended by Delhi Lieutenant-Governor Anil Baijal and senior police officials. The meeting concluded with the decision to take all possible steps to contain violence. Kejriwal stated that Shah had assured the availability of an adequate number of policemen.

National Security Advisor Ajit Doval was given the responsibility of restoring peace in the region. On 26 February, Doval travelled to the violence-hit regions and spoke to locals, assuring them of normalcy.

=== Relief measures ===
On 27 February, Kejriwal announced free treatment for the injured in government as well as private hospitals under the Farishta scheme. The government had made arrangements with the help of NGOs to supply food in areas where a curfew had been imposed. He also announced a compensation amount of ₹1 million (US$10,000) to affected people, ₹100,000 (US$1,000) ex-gratia, and ₹500,000 (US$5,200) in the case of a death of a minor. He also announced that the Delhi government had set up nine shelters for the people affected by the riots. For people whose houses were completely burnt, immediate assistance of ₹25,000 (US$260) was announced.

Food and other relief materials were distributed with the help of resident welfare associations and NGOs. BJP leaders Tajinder Bagga and Kapil Mishra collected ₹7.1 million (US$74,000) for the Hindu victims of Delhi riots via crowdfunding.

=== Reactions ===
AAP leader Sanjay Singh released a video in which BJP MLA from Laxmi Nagar, Abhay Verma, was seen leading crowds that raised slogans Jō Hindū hit kī bāt karēgā, vahī dēś pē rāj karēgā (transl. "Whoever talks about the welfare of Hindus, only they will rule the country") and Jai Śrī Rām (transl. "Hail Lord Rama"). Singh accused Home Minister Amit Shah of holding an "all-party meeting, pretending to restore peace and their MLA is engaged in inciting riots." Verma meanwhile defended himself claiming the slogans were raised by civilians.

Indian National Congress president Sonia Gandhi held a press conference at which she said that Shah should resign for failing to stop the violence. She asked for the deployment of an adequate number of security forces. Gandhi's press conference was followed by a press conference by Prakash Javadekar; he said that there is "selective silence" from AAP and Congress and he added that they are politicising violence.

After three days of violence with 20 deaths, the Prime Minister of India, Narendra Modi, shared a message on Twitter asking people to maintain peace. Commentators said that he reacted only after the departure of President Trump, whom he had been hosting on a state visit while the riots began.

On 26 February, the US Commission on International Religious Freedom (USCIRF) conveyed "grave concern" over the riots and requested the Indian government to provide protection to people, no matter which faith they belonged to. US Senator and 2020 US presidential candidate Bernie Sanders and other American politicians expressed their concerns over the events. In response, on 27 February 2020, the Ministry of External Affairs spokesperson, Raveesh Kumar, stated that these remarks were "factually inaccurate", "misleading" and "aimed at politicising the issue". BJP general secretary BL Santhosh threatened Sanders with election interference due to his condemnation. The US issued a travel advisory for its citizens to exercise caution.

On 27 February, United Nations High Commissioner for Human Rights, Michelle Bachelet, stated, "Indians in huge numbers, and from all communities, have expressed—in a mostly peaceful manner—their opposition to the Act, and support for the country's long tradition of secularism". She expressed concern on the citizenship law and reports of "police inaction" during the communal attacks in Delhi. Twelve eminent citizens of Bangladesh also expressed grave concern over the communal clashes on that day. They expressed fear that India's failure to handle the situation could create a volatile environment in its neighbouring countries, which could destroy peace, democracy, development and communal harmony in the region. The Governor of Meghalaya, Tathagata Roy, wanted lessons to be learned from Deng Xiaoping's handling of the 1989 Tiananmen Square protests for ways to handle the riots. Also on the same day, Turkish president Erdogan criticised the violence. He said, "India right now has become a country where massacres are widespread. What massacres? Massacres of Muslims. By who? Hindus."

On 2 March, the Chief Minister of West Bengal, Mamata Banerjee, alleged that the Delhi riot was a "planned genocide". On 5 March, Supreme Leader of Iran, Ayatollah Ali Khamenei, asked the Indian Government to confront extremist Hindus and their parties and stop the massacre of Muslims of India, to prevent India from being isolated from the world of Islam.

== Investigation ==
On 27 February 2020, the Delhi Police reported that two Special Investigation Teams (SIT) had been formed to investigate the violence. DCP Joy Tirkey and DCP Rajesh Deo were appointed head of these SITs respectively, along with four Assistant Commissioners in each team. Additional Commissioner of crime branch, B.K. Singh, was announced to be supervising the work of the SITs. On 28 February 2020, the police also called in forensic science teams, who visited the crime scenes to collect evidence.

As of 7 March 2020, police had registered 690 FIRs and around 2200 individuals involved in the violence were taken into custody. Some activists were charged with offences under the Indian Penal code and the Arms Act. Their friends and relatives alleged that they were tortured in custody. During a parliamentary debate over the riots on 11 March, Home Minister Amit Shah stated that rioters who had come from Uttar Pradesh had been identified.

In 2021, Mohd Wasim, Mohd Ayaz and Khalid were arrested for involvement in the murder of Delhi Police head constable Ratan Lal. In 2022, an unnamed woman and a man named Munjtajim were arrested for Ratan Lal and Intelligence Bureau staffer Ankit Sharma's murder respectively.

=== Supreme Court hearing ===
Bhim Army chief Chandrashekhar Azad Ravan, along with former Chief Information Commissioner Wajahat Habibullah and social activist Syed Bahadur Abbas Naqvi, filed an appeal in the Supreme Court requesting that the police be directed to file reports over cases of violence that had occurred since the night of 23 February. The petition also accused Mishra of "inciting and orchestrating the riots". During the hearing held on 26 February, the Supreme Court criticized the Delhi Police for not having done enough to stop the violence. However, the bench, consisting of Justices Sanjay Kishan Kaul and K. M. Joseph, did not entertain the plea, stating that the case was already in the Delhi High Court.

=== Delhi High Court hearing ===
Activists Harsh Mander and Farah Naqvi filed a plea in the Delhi High Court, demanding that the police report and arrest those involved in the violence on 25 February. The plea further demanded that a Special Investigation Team (SIT) be set up to investigate the incident and that compensation be provided to those killed and injured. It also requested for the immediate deployment of the Indian Army in the affected areas.

==== Court hearing on 26 February ====
At midnight on 26 February, the court bench, consisting of Justices S. Muralidhar and Talwant Singh, heard the emergency plea, following which, the court ordered the police to safeguard and help all victims to reach their nearest hospitals.

In the hearing during the morning, DCP of crime branch, Rajesh Deo, and the Solicitor General of India, Tushar Mehta, surprised the court by admitting that they had not watched the video of the inflammatory speech given by Kapil Mishra. However, Deo admitted to have watched the videos of Anurag Thakur and Parvesh Verma. The Court then played the video clip of Kapil Mishra's speech. The bench expressed "anguish" over the inability of the Delhi Police to control the riots and its failure to file FIRs against four BJP leaders, Kapil Mishra, Anurag Thakur, Parvesh Verma and Abhay Verma for their hate speeches. The bench also noted that incidents like the 1984 anti-Sikh riots must be prevented from ever occurring again in Delhi.

==== Transfer of Justice Muralidhar ====
Late on the night of 26 February, Justice S. Muralidhar, who had presided over the plea hearing, was transferred to the Punjab and Haryana High Court. This was the same day on which he had condemned the Delhi Police for its failure in controlling the riots or filing cases against BJP leaders for hate speech. However, the Law Minister Ravi Shankar Prasad stated that this was a routine transfer which had been recommended by the Supreme Court a fortnight before. BBC News reported that Muralidhar's "biting comments could have hastened his transfer". The news of his removal from the case was criticised by many Indians who expressed concern. The Congress party called his transfer a move to protect the accused BJP leaders. The Delhi High Court Bar Association criticised the transfer and asked the Supreme Court collegium to revoke it.

==== Court hearing under new bench ====
On 27 February, the court resumed the hearing with a new bench consisting of Chief Justice of India D.N. Patel and Justice C. Hari Shankar. During the previous hearing, the Delhi police were given 24 hours to decide on the filing of FIRs over hate speeches by four BJP leaders. The government's lawyer claimed that the situation was not "conducive" and that the government needed more time before it could take appropriate action. The new bench accepted the same arguments that the previous bench had rejected and agreed to give the government more time to decide on filing of the cases for hate speech. The petitioners' lawyer requested an earlier hearing, citing the increasing number of deaths, but the court set 13 April as the date of the next hearing.

On 28 February, the court issued notices to the local and central governments seeking their responses on registering FIRs on Congress party leaders Sonia Gandhi, Rahul Gandhi, and Priyanka Gandhi on the charges of delivering hate speeches. Hearing another plea, the bench also issued notice to the Delhi police and the central government for their response on registering FIR on AAP MLA Amanatullah Khan, actress Swara Bhaskar, activist Harsh Mander and on AIMIM leaders like Akbaruddin Owaisi, Asaduddin Owaisi, and Waris Pathan. The court later posted the matter to be heard again on 13 April.

AAP leader Tahir Hussain was denied bail. The court said there's enough material on record to presume the former councillor was present at the spot of crime and was instigating the rioters. Karkardooma court in Delhi framed murder and conspiracy charges against Aam Aadmi Party leader Tahir Hussain and ten others for the murder of IB officer. While framing the charges, the court observed, “Tahir was continuously acting in a manner of supervising & motivating this mob. All these things were done to target Hindus. Every member of the mob assembled there participated in achieving the objective of targeting Hindus".

In September 2021, a Delhi High Court Justice, Subramonium Prasad, noted that the riots were a "preplanned and pre-meditated conspiracy to disturb law and order in the city" and that the rioters' conduct "was a calculated attempt to dislocate the functioning of the government as well as to disrupt the normal life of the people in the city."

=== Court convictions ===
On 13 March, court convicted nine persons involved in the riots. The court noted that the main objective of the convicts who joined the unruly mob guided by ‘communal feelings’ was to cause ‘maximum damage to the properties belonging to the people of the Hindu community'. A further 2 have been subsequently convicted of crimes relating to the riots.

As of January 2026, five Muslim students and activists were released but Umar Khalid and Sharjeel Imam were still detained without trial.

In July 2026, Tahir Hussain, who was at that time an AAP councillor, along with co-accused Nazim, Kasim, Javed and Anas were convicted of murdering an Intelligence Bureau staffer, Ankit Sharma by Karkardooma court. During the trial of Tahir Hussain, Additional Sessions Judge Praveen Singh said in the judgement that the convicts were driven by "animus against Hindus" and that Hussain was not only a conspirator but also "taking active part in the riots".

== Aftermath ==
In the aftermath of the riots, many Muslims who had been living in the riot-affected neighbourhoods left with all their belongings. Even in areas of Delhi which were not affected by the violence, many Muslim families packed up their belongings and left for their ancestral villages, showing no intention of ever coming back. According to complaints received by lawyers representing Muslim victims of the riots, the police had threatened to falsely implicate the victims in police cases if they filed any complaints against the rioters. As of October 2020, many Muslim survivors of the riots reported harassment and humiliation within their immediate neighbourhoods and many even started selling their properties below the market price so as escape from this ordeal. According to Zafarul Islam Khan, former chairman of the Delhi Minorities Commission, 1,300 Muslim youth have been arrested since the riots began and pressure has been constantly mounted on the Delhi police to create a fabricated narrative that these youths started the riots. The Special Commissioner of Police (Crime) had written in an order dated 8 July to senior officers heading probe teams and asked them to “suitably” guide the Investigating Officers to note that the arrests of “some Hindu youth” from riot-hit areas in Northeast Delhi has led to a “degree of resentment among the Hindu community” and “due care and precaution” must be taken while making such arrests. This was despite the fact that the Delhi Police Crime Branch investigations into the murder of nine Muslims at and around Bhagirathi Vihar in North-East Delhi on 25 and 26 February had led to a WhatsApp group named "Kattar Hindu Ekta", which was created to mobilise rioters. The investigators had filed three chargesheets in connection with three of the murder cases and nine people were chargesheeted. According to Hisham ul wahab, "it has been a pattern in almost all the anti-Muslim violence in India that to call it “communal riots” in order to avoid the supposed blame over the perpetrators from the Hindu fold as well as to narrate it in a balanced/neutral way as both the communities involved in it are occupying equal and parallel power. However, an assessment of such a narrative with the help of various reports including the Sachar Committee report would be sufficient to explore the historical disparity and discrimination against the Muslim community in terms of socio-political-economic and educational parameters".

For those left homeless or who had run away from their homes out of fear, temporary relief camps were set up in houses, temples, madrasas and the Al-Hind Hospital. Camps housing larger numbers were erected in areas like Idgah, the Mustafabad prayer ground. The Idgah camp was the largest among nine others and was funded by the government. However, it soon grew crowded. Volunteers helped victims by distributing carts to vendors and providing others with legal aid or even simple help in filling forms. Doctors volunteered to provide medical attention to people suffering from injuries. Most of the refugees were reported to suffer from skin rashes and the common cold. Many others, including the children, were reported to be suffering from anxiety and mental trauma. They reported to have lost their homes and their livelihoods and were awaiting government help to rebuild their lives. In another camp in Khajuri Khas, a team of paralegals ran a relief assistance booth of the government. These victims then faced the threat of coronavirus, with social distancing being impossible given the number of people crowded in these camps. Following this, the Delhi government forcefully evicted the residents of the Idgah camp by 30 March, leaving many homeless. The victims were promised rations and a sum of ₹3,000 (equivalent to ₹3,900 or US$40 in 2026) to rent rooms for themselves, but not all were able to avail of these relief measures.

Anil Joseph Thomas Couto, the Archbishop of Delhi, stated that churches were using their resources to help those affected by the riots; the Holy Family Hospital, for example, engaged physicians, nurses, as well as ambulances to provide relief to affected people. He further stated that Catholic churches would accept those affected by the riots, especially with it being the season of Lent.

Hindus and businesses run by them in the riot-affected areas began boycotting traders and refused to hire workers who were Muslims. They alleged that the Muslims had started the riots and had then blamed the Hindus for the violence. As a result of the growing distrust between the two communities in these areas, the Hindus and Muslims would avoid each other during the day and block the lanes to their respective neighbourhoods with barriers at night. Neighbourhoods of both communities put up metal gates to slow down the passage of rioters in the future, with some keeping themselves permanently armed with lathis (bamboo sticks).

Hindu politicians paraded injured victims with bandages wrapped around their heads in multiple "peace marches", alleging that they were victims of violence at the hands of Muslims. This incited more hatred towards Muslims. One such rally held on 29 February was organised by the Delhi Peace Forum, an NGO backed by the Rashtriya Swayamsevak Sangh, with people holding placards that said, "Delhi against jihadi violence". Kapil Mishra was seen at the rally, while inflammatory slogans inciting people to "shoot the traitors" were heard. Gangs of Hindus later appeared in multiple neighbourhoods and threatened the Muslims living there to abandon their homes before the Hindu festival of Holi, which was celebrated on 9 March 2020.

Malayalam news channels Asianet News and MediaOne TV were banned by the Ministry of Information and Broadcasting (I&B) for 48 hours on 6 March for broadcasting about the riots and the lack of action taken by the police. However, the ban was soon reversed by I&B Minister Prakash Javadekar, following multiple complaints.

During a parliamentary debate over the riots on 11 March, Home Minister Amit Shah gave his condolences to the families of those who died due to the violence and assured them of justice. He went on to commend the Delhi Police for their efforts and blamed Muslim leaders and members of the Congress party for instigating the riots. Another BJP MP, Meenakshi Lekhi, accused ISIS elements of having organised the riots. Members of the opposition like Kapil Sibal, Adhir Ranjan Chowdhury and Asaduddin Owaisi criticised the government for its lack of timely action.

In response to an RTI application on 13 April, the Delhi Police stated that 23 people had died and 48 people had been arrested in connection with the riots. This was in stark contrast to the report of 52 deaths and 3,304 arrests submitted by Junior Home Minister G. Kishan Reddy on 18 March, who had obtained the figures from the Delhi Police.

== Fact finding reports ==
Various fact finding reports have been released about the violence surrounding the riots.

- Delhi Minority Commission, “Report of the DMC fact-finding Committee on North-East Delhi Riots of February 2020”, 27 June 2020, New Delhi.
- Delhi Riots 2020: Report from Ground Zero – The Shaheen Bagh Model in North-East Delhi: From Dharna to Danga, was submitted on 11 March 2020, by the Group of Intellectuals and Academicians (GIA) led by Supreme Court advocate Monika Arora. This report suggests that the violence was attributed to an "Urban-Naxal-Jihadi network" and portrays the events as a pre-planned outcome of a radicalized minority.
- Delhi Riots: Conspiracy Unraveled, submitted on 29 May 2020, by the Call for Justice (CFJ) group, led by Justice Ambadas Joshi, a retired judge of the Bombay High Court, asserts that "Anti-National, extremist Islamic groups and other radical groups" deliberately carried out targeted attacks on the Hindu community. This report alleges meticulous planning and coordination behind the violence.
- Human Rights Watch, “Shoot the Traitors’: Discrimination Against Muslims under India's New Citizenship Policy”, April 2020, United States of America.
- Youth for Human Rights Documentation, “An Account of Fear & Impunity: Preliminary Fact-Finding Report on Communally-Targeted Violence in North-East Delhi, February 2020”, New Delhi.
- Sharma, Nupur J and Kalpojyoti Kashyap. (2020), Delhi Anti-Hindu Riots of 2020: The Macabre Dance of Violence Since December 2019, New Delhi: OpIndia.
- Amnesty International India, “India: Six Months Since Delhi Riots, Delhi Police Continue To Enjoy Impunity Despite Evidence Of Human Rights Violations”, 28 August 2020, New Delhi.
- In October 2022, a fact-finding committee found that the Union home ministry delayed the deployment of additional forces in the violence-hit areas. The committee headed by a former Supreme Court judge Madan B. Lokur concluded that the communal riots continued unabated between 23 and 26 February 2020.

== Books on the riots ==
In August 2020, a book titled Delhi Riots 2020: The Untold Story by advocate Monika Arora and academics Sonali Chitalkar and Prerna Malhotra was scheduled to be published by Bloomsbury India, which however withdrew the book after facing criticism from other writers and activists. The new publishers Garuda Prakashan said that by 24 August, they had received 15,000 pre-orders.

== See also ==
- List of riots in India
- Persecution of Hindus
- Religious violence in India
- Violence against Muslims in India
