= Iron Sea and the Cavalry =

Studio album by Pete Francis
- Released: March 18, 2008
- Recorded: 2007
- Genre: Progressive rock
- Label: Scrapper Records
- Producer: Pete Francis; Jack Gauthier

Pete Francis chronology
| Everything Is One (2006) | Iron Sea and the Cavalry (2008) | Wake the Mountain (2009) |

Iron Sea and the Cavalry is Pete Francis' fifth studio album. Recorded in 2007, it was released on March 18, 2008, through Scrapper Records. The album's artwork was drawn by Francis' wife, visual artist Katie Heimbold, who also has vocals on the track "Johnny Ocho's Lullaby".

== Track listing ==
Track listing adapted from Bandcamp.

1. "Johnny Ocho's Lullaby"
2. "Armies of Angels"
3. "Carousel"
4. "Carnival"
5. "Shooting Star and the Ambulance"
6. "Case of Bad Love"
7. "Let It Go"
8. "Iron Sea and the Cavalry"
9. "Stowaway"
10. "Heavenly Boat"
