= Delhi Riots 2020: The Untold Story =

2020 book by Monika Arora, Sonali Chitalkar, and Prerna Malhotra

- First edition
- Author: Monika Arora; Sonali Chitalkar; Prerna Malhotra
- Language: English
- Publisher: Bloomsbury India (withdrawn); Garuda Prakashan
- Publication place: India
- Website: www.garudabooks.com/delhi-riots-2020-the-untold-story

Delhi Riots 2020: The Untold Story is a 2020 book about the Delhi riots that took place over a period of six days in February 2020 in which 53 died, including 36 Muslims and 15 Hindus. According to the current publisher's website, the book aims to substantiate the claim that "the riots were planned and executed by Urban Naxal and Jihadi elements in Delhi"; which Amnesty International, Human Rights Watch and the Delhi Minorities Commission contradict.

Garuda Prakashan received over 15,000 pre-orders in a day after it opened its website for the booking.

== Authors ==
Delhi Riots 2020 is authored by Monika Arora, Sonali Chitalkar, and Prerna Malhotra. Arora is a Delhi-based lawyer practicing in the Supreme Court of India. She is a standing counsel for the Government of India, in the Delhi High Court. She is former DUSU President from ABVP, during 1992–1993. She also practices in the district courts. Chitalkar is an assistant professor of political science at Miranda House, University of Delhi. Malhotra is also an assistant professor for English at Ram Lal Anand College, University of Delhi. She has a Ph.D. and has co-authored and edited six books. The authors are part of the Group of Intellectuals and Academicians (GIA), who had earlier submitted the report of their fact-finding mission on the 2020 Delhi riots to the Minister of State for Home Affairs G. Kishen Reddy.

== Publication controversy ==
The book was originally published by Bloomsbury India. The controversy started because Kapil Misra, who was named in the Delhi Minority Commission's fact-finding report, was invited to the book's launch. On 22 August 2020, after a backlash, Bloomsbury withdrew from publishing the book. On 23 August 2020, publishing house Garuda Prakashan said that they would be publishing it.

Bloomsbury India put out a statement:

Bloomsbury India had planned to release Delhi Riots 2020: The Untold Story in September, a book purportedly giving a factual report on the riots in Delhi in February 2020, based on investigations and interviews conducted by the authors. However, in view of very recent events including a virtual pre-publication launch organised without our knowledge by the authors, with participation by parties of whom the publishers would not have approved, we have decided to withdraw publication of the book. Bloomsbury India strongly supports freedom of speech but also has a deep sense of responsibility towards society.

Following the stepping in of Garuda Prakashan, Tamil Nadu-based Footprint Publications, run by a BJP leader, also announced it would print a Tamil version of the book.

Monika Arora argued that the withdrawal of Bloomsbury India from publication is an attack on freedom of expression.

After finding that a PDF copy of the book was circulating online while "Bloomsbury India was granted the sole and exclusive licence to reproduce copies of her book", the authors filed a complaint with the Commissioner of Police, Delhi against Bloomsbury India "for the offence of criminal breach of trust, cheating, mischief, misappropriation of property". Also complaining that Bloomsbury India was "rescinding on its obligations to publish and distribute her book titled Delhi Riots 2020: The Untold Story." The complaint stated:

On the date of the launch, at 3:30 PM, the Publisher phoned the Author to say that it was considering withdrawing the book on account of pressure of its parent company Bloomsbury UK, and from certain other persons on social media. While the book launch event was live, a statement came to be issued by the Publisher that it had decided to withdraw the book.

It accused Nandini Sundar, The Quint, and Newslaundry of "illegal receipt and retention of stolen property". It further accused Aatish Taseer, Arfa Khanum Sherwani, Saket Gokhale, and William Dalrymple of "criminal intimidation and statements creating and promoting enmity between communities."

Multiple authors, including economist Sanjeev Sanyal, retired Indian Administrative Service officer Sanjay Dixit, and Jawaharlal Nehru University professor Anand Ranganathan severed their ties with Bloomsbury India following the controversy.

== Reception ==
The Quint wrote that "the book is mostly based on conjectures, conspiracy theories and is also riddled with misinformation". Questioning the access of the book by The Quint and Newslaundry before its formal publication, the authors filed a criminal complaint against Bloomsbury India for having "leaked a PDF version of her book", to "hamper any future sales".

As of 24 August 2020, publisher Garuda Prakashan had 15,000 pre-orders for the book. The number of pre-orders doubled to 30,000 by 30 August 2020. The book was released virtually by Garuda Prakashan on 20 September 2020.
