= An Untold Story =

- Once Upon a Time episode
- Episode no.: Season 5 Episode 23
- Directed by: Dean White
- Written by: Edward Kitsis & Adam Horowitz
- Production code: 523
- Original air date: May 15, 2016

Guest appearances
- Hank Harris as The Groundsman/Dr. Jekyll; Tzi Ma as the Dragon; Arnold Pinnock as The Orderly/Mr. Poole; Olivia Taylor Steele Falconer as Violet; Sam Witwer as The Warden/Mr. Hyde

Episode chronology
← Previous "Only You"	Next → "The Savior"
- Once Upon a Time season 5

"An Untold Story" is the twenty-third episode of the fifth season of the American fantasy drama series Once Upon a Time, which aired on May 15, 2016. The episode served as part 2 of the 2-part fifth-season finale, with the first part being "Only You".

In this episode, Henry, Violet, Emma, Regina, and Mr. Gold work together to bring Snow, David, Hook and Zelena back from the Land of Untold Stories. Near the end, Regina takes the Evil Queen out of her, and Mr. Hyde arrives in Storybrooke.

== Plot ==
=== Opening sequence ===
No special element is featured in the title card. (Original airing)

The title logo is attached to a flying dirigible. (Later releases)

=== Event chronology ===
The Land of Untold Stories, Land Without Magic and Storybrooke events take place after "Only You" and before "The Savior".

=== In the Land of Untold Stories ===
Dr. Jekyll awakens in a straitjacket, finding Poole unconscious from too much whisky; freeing himself, he takes Poole's keys as Hyde has hidden the wand. Freeing Zelena, Hook, Snow, and David, he explains that "The Warden" stole Zelena's wand. They find themselves in the “land of untold stories,” filled with escapees from various worlds seeking refuge; as they are in this realm, their stories have halted as time does not pass here.

Dr. Jekyll has just finished with a blue serum with flower sap that turned into a red serum which will separate the evil from the good in a person. However, Poole enters and forces him to transform into Mr. Hyde once again by using the blue serum; the heroes flee per Jekyll's request. After they escape, Mr. Hyde injects himself with the red serum, splitting himself and Dr. Jekyll apart, but as Hyde tries to kill Jekyll, Hook and the others rescue Jekyll. Zelena uses fireball at Poole and Snow uses Poole's magical gizmo to zap Hyde unconscious. Jekyll takes his serum and tools with him just before Hyde wakes up.

As the group keeps trying to escape out of the realm, they end up ultimately running into dead ends at every turn. Suddenly, thanks to Henry's inspiring the New Yorkers to toss coins into the Bethesda fountain, a portal opens, and Hook, Snow, David, Zelena, and Jekyll escape and find themselves in New York City, right in front of the fountain, where they reunite with Emma, Regina, Henry, and Violet.

Later on, Hyde begins throwing tantrums in his laboratory, where he is surprised to see Gold, who slipped through the portal to find Belle. Gold wants to threaten Hyde with death, but lets him live upon learning that Hyde knows how to wake Belle without true love's kiss. This results in a deal made between Gold and Hyde.

=== In New York City ===
In a hotel, Gold swipes a sterling silver tray from a concierge and gives him $100 to be left alone. When Emma learns via text that Zelena, Hook, and the others have disappeared, Regina goes right to Gold's hotel room and tells him that she may be turning to darkness again. Emma tries to snag the Olympian Crystal as Gold is distracted, but he is on to their scheme and is about to chase them out, when Henry enters with the Holy Grail and drains the crystal of magic. An angry Gold scolds Henry for accidentally preventing their family from coming home. Gold then concede that Storybrooke was never in danger, just the magic he brought to it; he lied to motivate Emma and Regina into finding Henry.

While Henry sulks at the Bethesda fountain with Violet, Gold takes Regina to find someone who he claims still has magic. Emma reminds Henry of their time in New York, telling him that he can still wish away his problems and toss a coin into the fountain; she reflects on the irony of her own words as she had wished to fill the void she felt in their family, which lead to Hook showing up with the memory potion. Elsewhere, Gold leads Regina into a shop, where they meet The Dragon, who survived Tamara's attack on him. Though he refuses to help Gold, the Dragon agrees to help Regina. Emma, Henry, Violet, Gold and Regina watch the Dragon create a small view of where their family is; however, he fails to open a portal as his magic is not enough. He tells them that despite being called the Land Without Magic, it does exist in the real world; however, it has become harder to tap into because of neglect.

Realizing what the Dragon means, Henry leads everyone back to the fountain, where he proceeds to wish for his family to be brought back, encouraging Emma, Regina, Gold, and Violet to do the same, causing the crystal to pulsate. Henry then convinces the citizens there to help them return magic to the world. The portal opens in the fountain, and Gold walks through it. Hook, Snow, David, Jekyll and Zelena then return via the portal, reuniting with the rest of the group. Henry is left saddened that the crowd believed that the rescue was an illusion. Emma consoles him, explaining that it's the only way they can understand it.

Afterwards, Regina decides to have some time to think, and, as Snow tries to console her, Regina believes there's nothing she can do to get rid of the Evil Queen inside of her. Jekyll reveals that he had another dose of the separation serum, allowing Regina the chance to push the Evil Queen out. Snow injects the serum into Regina's arm, and Emma and Snow stand by, ready to help. Regina and the Evil Queen split into two entities, and Regina rips the evil queen's heart out and crushes it, seemingly destroying her darkness.

Back at the Dragon's shop, the Dragon hears his windchimes ring as a dark lime smoke enters. The smoke takes the form of the Evil Queen, who takes the Dragon's heart, declaring war on her other self.

=== In Storybrooke ===
Upon arrival in Storybrooke, Dr. Jekyll finds the town more beautiful than they described it to him; David and Mary Margaret take him to Granny's for a meal. Emma tells Hook she loves him, with both ready to take their relationship further. Henry prepares to say goodbye to Violet, believing she and her father, Sir Morgan, will return to Camelot. However, Violet reveals that while she was born in Camelot, her father is from Connecticut, but fell into a portal to Camelot at one point; thus they will stay in town for a while. Happy to hear this, Henry shares a kiss with Violet.

Henry later catches up with Regina, asking how she feels no longer shackled to the Evil Queen; Regina responds that she feels freer than she ever did. Regina releases Storybrooke's magic from the Olympian Crystal, with the crystal vanishing after being emptied. To their surprise, Mr. Hyde shows up; Regina immediately realizes that Gold brought Hyde to Storybrooke as part of a deal. Hyde explains that Gold gave his ownership of the town to him in exchange for the information to wake Belle from her sleeping curse; he also brought some of his "friends" as Storybrooke is the ideal place for the populace of the Land of Untold Stories to have their lives unfold. Regina taunts him, telling Hyde that he's the loser of his own story. However, Hyde returns the taunt mysteriously, warning that darkness is not as easy to snuff out as she believes.

== Cultural references ==
- Snow figures out the story of the good doctor is Jekyll and Hyde, and David mentions the groundsman is Dr. Jekyll and the warden is Mr. Hyde. (Zelena and Hook have no idea who Hyde is as they weren't cursed with real world memories during the first Dark Curse.)
- Violet's father, Sir Morgan, is based on the character Hank Morgan from Mark Twain's novel A Connecticut Yankee in King Arthur's Court.
- The real-world Bethesda Terrace and Fountain is actually located in Central Park, while the show's version of the landmark is located in front of the New York Public Library.

== Reception ==
Andrea Towers of Entertainment Weekly gave it a good review: "And if you thought we were done with surprises to set up next season, let me assure you we’re just getting started. Who shows up in Chinatown? None other than the Evil Queen, who claims “Regina never should have let me out to play.” And this is a war now. You thought the Big Bad for season 6 was Hyde? Try Dark Regina instead. And yes, I'm into it. Lana Parrilla is one of the best things about this show, and I'll take anything that gives her a chance to flex her acting chops."

In a review from Rickey.org, Nick Roman said, "Last week, I was pretty miffed about Once Upon A Time and its treatment of Regina (Lana Parrilla). While I ultimately liked the episode, it felt like the show was continuing to use her as a punching bag to move the plot forward. Need something bad to happen to one of our characters? Just take it out on Regina! Granted, it’s a formula that has served Once Upon A Time in the past, but at this point, it just felt repetitive. That’s why “Only You” and “An Untold Story” provided such a fresh change of pace for a season finale that not only sets up the next phase of the story, but also promises to put Regina in a more central role."

Amy Ratcliffe of IGN said of the episode, "Once Upon a Time's trend of setting up the next season in the finale continued with the final installments of Season 5. Regina thankfully didn't go back to her Evil Queen ways and they, in fact, put a fresh spin on her turmoil and tied it nicely to the Jekyll/Hyde mythology. The only hiccup – and it was a big one – was Henry's all over the map behavior that caused all sorts of action. Two jam-packed episodes after a somewhat sleepy half season in the Underworld was jarring and made you realize how much story the show can churn through when it's not stretching out a "themed" plot." Ratcliffe gave the episode a 7.9 rating out of 10.

Gwen Ihnat of The A.V. Club gave the episode a good review, giving it a B overall. In her recap: "There are two competing themes in this Once Upon A Time double-episode finale, and one is leagues more successful than the other. Just when you get the feeling that OUAT can do little else but beat a dead horse forever (Hades’ blue hair! The River Of Lost Souls!), it pulls out actual insight about the duplicitousness of personality, handily personified by Dr. Jekyll and Mr. Hyde, as well as the Evil Queen herself, Regina."

Christine Orlando of TV Fanatic gave the episode a 4.8 out of 5.
