= Untold (album) =

Studio album by Pete Francis
- Released: 2003
- Genre: Progressive rock
- Label: Scrapper Records
- Producer: Pete Francis

Pete Francis chronology
So They Say (2001)	Untold (2003)	Good To Finally Know (2004)

Untold is an album by Pete Francis, released in 2003. The album looked into Pete's rock side more than his previous album, So They Say had. Untold featured tracks like Burning the River, which was originally written for Dispatch, but stirred argument from the drummer/vocalist Brad Corrigan. Tracks range from a general rock feel to reggae and acoustic.

== Track listing ==
1. "One Train"
2. "Burning The River"
3. "Julie"
4. "Stones"
5. "Untold"
6. "Shake the Pain"
7. "Coal Miner"
8. "Beneath the Fire"
9. "Motion"
10. "Sandcastle City"
11. "OK"
