= Stories Untold =

Stories Untold may refer to:

- Stories Untold (album), an album by JJ Lin
- Stories Untold (video game), a 2017 episodic horror adventure game
