= Atlanta Braves tomahawk chop and name controversy =

American baseball controversy

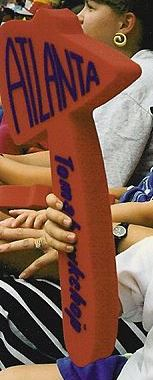
A foam tomahawk

The Atlanta Braves tomahawk chop and name controversy involves the name and tomahawk chop tradition by the Atlanta Braves, an American Major League Baseball (MLB) franchise. Native Americans have been questioning the Braves' mascot choices since 1972. Native American objections to the tomahawk chop received much attention during the 1990s and have continued into the 2020s. The Atlanta Braves and their fans continue their overwhelming support of the team name and chop tradition.

== History ==
=== Team name history and origin ===
Before the team was named the Boston Braves, it went through several nicknames, including the Red Stockings, the Beaneaters, the Doves, the Red Caps, the Rustlers, and the Bees. In 1912, the owner, James Gaffney, named the team the Boston Braves. Gaffney was an alderman of the New York City-based political organization Tammany Hall, whose name was appropriated from Lenape chief Tamanend. Tammany Hall used a Native American headdress as its emblem and referred to its members as "Braves".

=== Chief Noc-A-Homa ===
In 1972, Russell Means filed a $9 million lawsuit against the Cleveland Indians for their use of the Chief Wahoo logo. Means also objected to the Braves' use of the Chief Noc-A-Homa mascot. Means said, "What if it was the Atlanta Germans and after every home run, a German dressed in military uniform began hitting a Jew on the head with a baseball bat?" Means was unaware that Chief Noc-A-Homa was portrayed by a Native American, Levi Walker. For a week, controversy raged. Walker went on radio talk shows to defend Chief Noc-A-Homa. He said, "I think Indians can be proud that their names are used with professional sports teams". The mascot was retired after the 1985 season.

=== Tomahawk chop ===
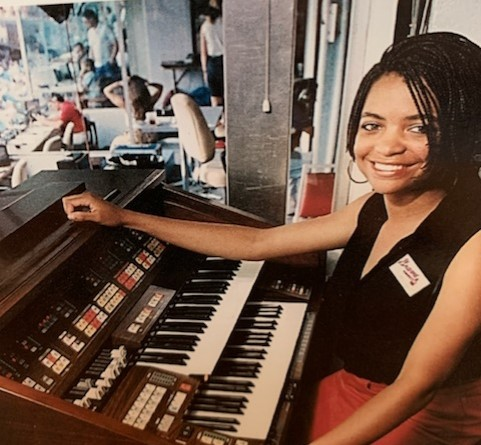
Braves organist Carolyn King was credited with originating the tomahawk song in 1991.

The tomahawk chop originated at Florida State and was adopted by fans of the Atlanta Braves in 1991. Carolyn King, the Braves' organist, stated she wasn't influenced by Florida State. She had played the "tomahawk song" during most at-bats for a few seasons, but it finally caught on with Braves fans when the team started winning. The usage of foam tomahawks led to criticism from Native American groups that it was "demeaning" to them and calls for them to be banned. In response, the Braves' public relations director said that it was "a proud expression of unification and family". King, who did not understand the political ramifications, approached one of the Native American chiefs who were protesting. The chief told her that leaving her job as an organist would not change anything and that if she left, "they'll find someone else to play".

Foam tomahawks were first created by foam salesman Paul Braddy in 1991 for the Braves, following their adoption of the tomahawk chop. Upon hearing Skip Caray say during a radio broadcast of an Atlanta Braves game that they needed tomahawks to accompany their newly acquired tomahawk chop celebration, Braddy approached the Braves' concessions manager, John Eifert, with a suggestion of a foam rubber tomahawk. Eifert agreed, providing they cost around $5, to which Braddy carved a tomahawk out of foam with an electric knife. The foam tomahawks became very popular with Braves fans at the Atlanta–Fulton County Stadium,—so much so, that Braddy was able to quit his $60,000-a-year salesman's job in order to manufacture foam tomahawks full-time and was able to create 8,000 a day.

The controversy has persisted since and became national news again during the 2019 National League Division Series. During the series, St. Louis Cardinals relief pitcher and Cherokee Nation member Ryan Helsley was asked about the chop and chant. Helsley said he found the fans' chanting and arm motions insulting and that the chop depicts natives "in this kind of caveman-type people way who aren't intellectual". The relief pitcher's comments prompted the Braves to stop handing out foam tomahawks, playing the chop music, or showing the chop graphic when the series returned to Atlanta for Game 5. The Braves released a statement, saying they would "continue to evaluate how we activate elements of our brand, as well as the overall in-game experience" and that they would continue a "dialogue with those in the Native American community after the postseason concludes". The heads of the Muscogee (Creek) Nation and Cherokee Nation (tribal nations whose ancestral homelands include Atlanta or Georgia and who faced removal during the Trail of Tears) both condemned the chop and chant. Principal Chief of the Cherokee Nation Chuck Hoskin Jr. made a statement, saying, "The Cherokee Nation is proud of tribal citizen and Cardinals pitcher Ryan Helsley for speaking out against stereotypes and standing up for the dignity of Native Americans in this country. Hopefully Ryan's actions will better inform the national conversation about inappropriate depictions of Native Americans". Muscogee Nation Principal Chief James R. Floyd said in a statement that the tomahawk chop is "not an appropriate acknowledgement of tribal tradition or culture". "It reduces Native Americans to a caricature and minimizes the contributions of Native peoples as equal citizens and human beings".

During the off-season, the Braves met with the National Congress of American Indians to start discussing a path forward. The NCAI has called on the Braves to end the tomahawk chop and change their mascot. For eighteen months after the 2019 NLDS incident, the president and CEO of the Braves, Derek Schiller, refused to disclose a position on the chop. When the Braves played their first home game with fans, the club encouraged fans to chant and chop. Commissioner of Baseball Rob Manfred opined during the 2021 World Series, "It's important to understand we have thirty markets around the country. They're not all the same. The Braves have done a phenomenal job with the Native American community". He supported the Braves' position on the matter because the Native American community in the Atlanta area "is wholly supportive of the Braves program, including the chop. For me, that's the end of the story".

Richard Sneed, the Principal Chief of the Eastern Band of Cherokee Indians, also stated that he personally is not offended by the name Braves or the tomahawk chop but calls the chant "hokey", adding, "I told them, man, that's like 1940s, 1950s spaghetti western stuff." Sneed said he respects the opinion of those who oppose the name and chop motion. "I always took it as, from the time I was a child or a teen, that it was an acknowledgement of the warrior spirit of Native Americans and their strength, and so forth", Sneed said. "To me, the only thing that's derogatory is Redskins". Before the 2021 World Series, citing the disproportionate rates of poverty, sexual assault, and substance use that Native Americans face, Sneed said, "there are huge issues that are facing Indian country, and I get a little bit frustrated when it seems to be the only thing that people are outraged about is somebody swinging their arm at a baseball game". He added, "I've been asked previously, 'Are you offended by the tomahawk on the uniform?' Like, why? A tomahawk is an inanimate object. Why would I be offended by that?" Still, the Eastern Cherokee Band of Indians and the Braves organization have embarked on efforts to be more culturally appropriate and to integrate parts of Cherokee language and culture into the team's activities, stadium, and merchandise.

=== Team name and branding ===
In the winter of 2013, the team came under fire for using the Native American head logo on their spring training caps. After two months of controversy, the Braves replaced the cap with a different design that didn't feature the old Native American mascot. In July 2020, after the Washington Redskins and Cleveland Indians announced they were reevaluating their Native American mascots, attention turned to the Atlanta Braves team name. The Braves released a statement, announcing that discussions were still ongoing about the chop, but the team name would not be changed. In an interview, Braves president Terry McGuirk said, "we are so proud of our team's name, and our expectation is that we will always be the Atlanta Braves".

In July 2020, Richard Sneed released a statement about the tribe's conversations with the Braves. The statement said the EBCI believed "that candid, thoughtful conversations are crucial to educating leaders and bringing about positive change". The EBCI statement also applauded "the Braves' willingness to engage in this effort and look forward to continuing to build the relationship the EBCI shares with them, to present a model for how other professional sports teams can work with Native Nations in a respectful and constructive manner". Before the 2021 World Series, the NCAI criticized the defense of the mascot and "chop" by MLB commissioner Manfred, and NCAI president Fawn Sharp reiterated the viewpoint of Native Americans that any caricature representation is harmful.

== See also ==
- Cleveland Indians name and logo controversy
- List of sports team names and mascots derived from indigenous peoples
- Native American mascot controversy
- Washington Redskins name controversy
- Chicago Blackhawks name and logo controversy
- Kansas City Chiefs name controversy
