= List of company and product names derived from Indigenous peoples =

The following is a list of company or product names derived from Indigenous peoples, excluding geographic names.

== Companies ==
- Chippewa Boots Originally named as the Chippewa Shoe Manufacturing Company
- Crazy Horse (Liz Claiborne clothing line)
- Indian Motocycle Manufacturing Company
- Mohawk Airlines
- Mohawk Gasoline
- Niagara-Mohawk Power Company, now part of National Grid USA
- Sioux Chief Manufacturing
- Fishawack Health

== Products ==
- American Indian herbal cigarettes
- Inca Cola, soft drink
- Indian Head corn meal
- MBDA Apache missile
- Mohawk steam locomotive
- Mohawk tile and carpet
- Mohawk Vodka
- Quechua, maker of outdoor gear
- Red Man, chewing tobacco
- Ticonderoga pencils
- Wamsutta sheets

=== Automobiles ===
- Chevrolet Apache
- Chevrolet Cheyenne
- Dodge Dakota
- Ford Thunderbird
- Jeep Cherokee
- Jeep Comanche
- Jeep Grand Cherokee
- Mazda Navajo
- Nissan Qashqai (ethnic group from around Iran)
- Pontiac (brand)
- Pontiac Aztek
- Pontiac Chieftain
- Pontiac Star Chief
- Pontiac Super Chief
- Toyota Tacoma
- Volkswagen Touareg (North African desert tribe)
- Volkswagen Taos
- Winnebago
- Land Rover Freelander Maasai

=== Aviation ===
==== Civilian ====
- Piper PA-23 Apache
- Piper PA-23 Aztek
- Piper PA-24 Comanche
- Piper PA-25 Pawnee
- Piper PA-28 Cherokee
- Piper PA-28-236 Dakota
- Piper PA-31 Navajo
- Piper PA-31P-350 Mojave
- Piper PA-31T Cheyenne
- Piper PA-34 Seneca
- Piper PA-44 Seminole

==== Military ====
- AH-56 Cheyenne
- AH-64 Apache
- Boeing-Sikorsky RAH-66 Comanche
- C-12 Huron
- CH-21 Shawnee
- CH-47 Chinook
- Douglas C-47 Skytrain, called Dakota by the British and Commonwealth air forces
- H-13 Sioux
- H-34 Choctaw
- OH-58 Kiowa
- OV-1 Mohawk
- TH-67 Creek
- U-8 Seminole
- UH-1 Iroquois
- UH-72 Lakota

=== Computing ===
- Apache Geronimo
- Apache HTTP Server
- Aztec C
- Cherokee HTTP Server
- Hiawatha HTTP Server

== Services ==
=== Railroad ===
- Southwest Chief, indirect descendant of the Super Chief, a run operated by Amtrak
- Super Chief, former (and famous) passenger run on the Santa Fe Railroad

=== Baking supplies ===
- Calumet, brand of baking powder taken from a French colonial-era name used for some ceremonial pipes

== See also ==
- Indigenous peoples
- List of sports team names and mascots derived from indigenous peoples
