= Kansas City Chiefs name controversy =

Racism debate in American football

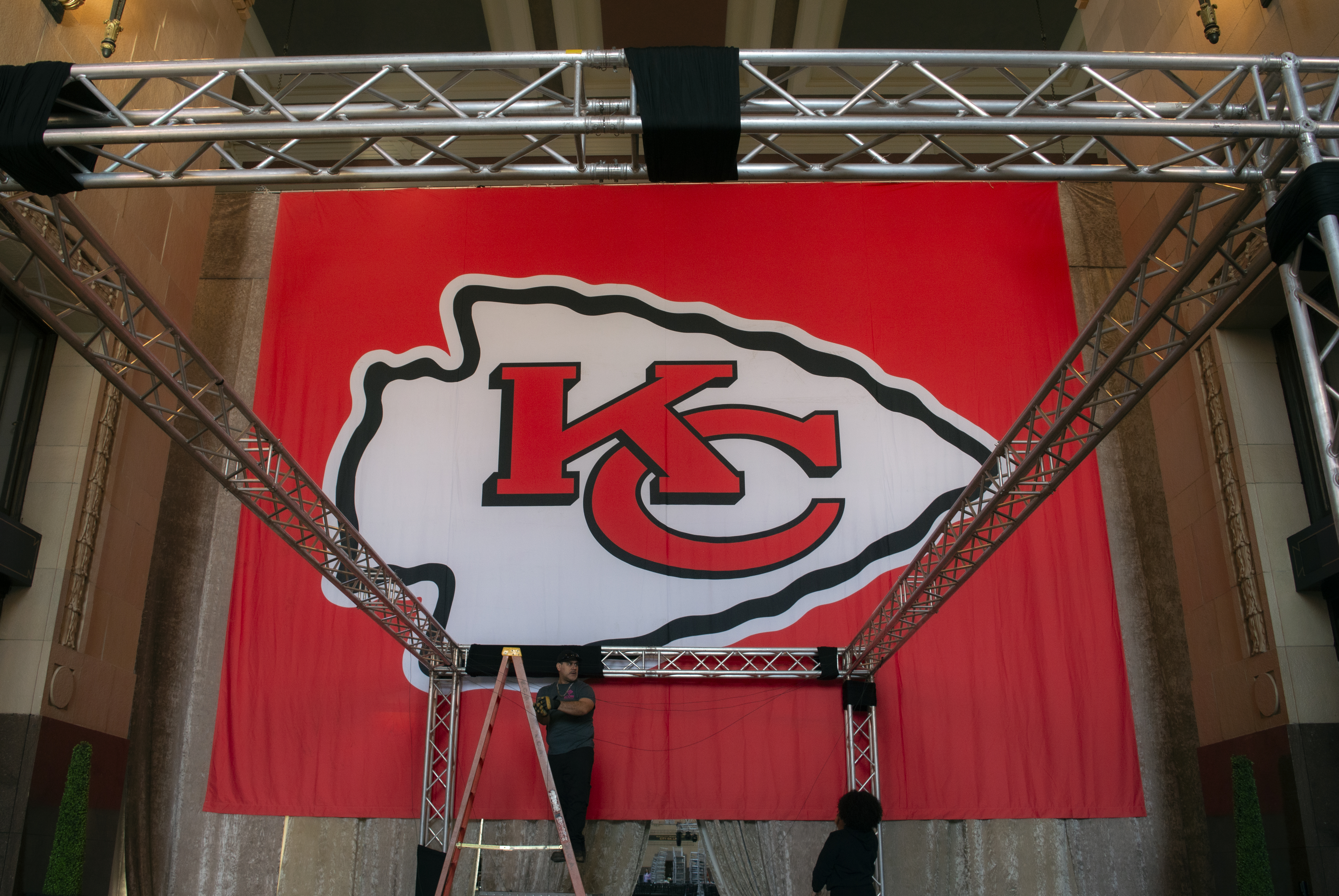
The Kansas City Chiefs logo features an arrowhead

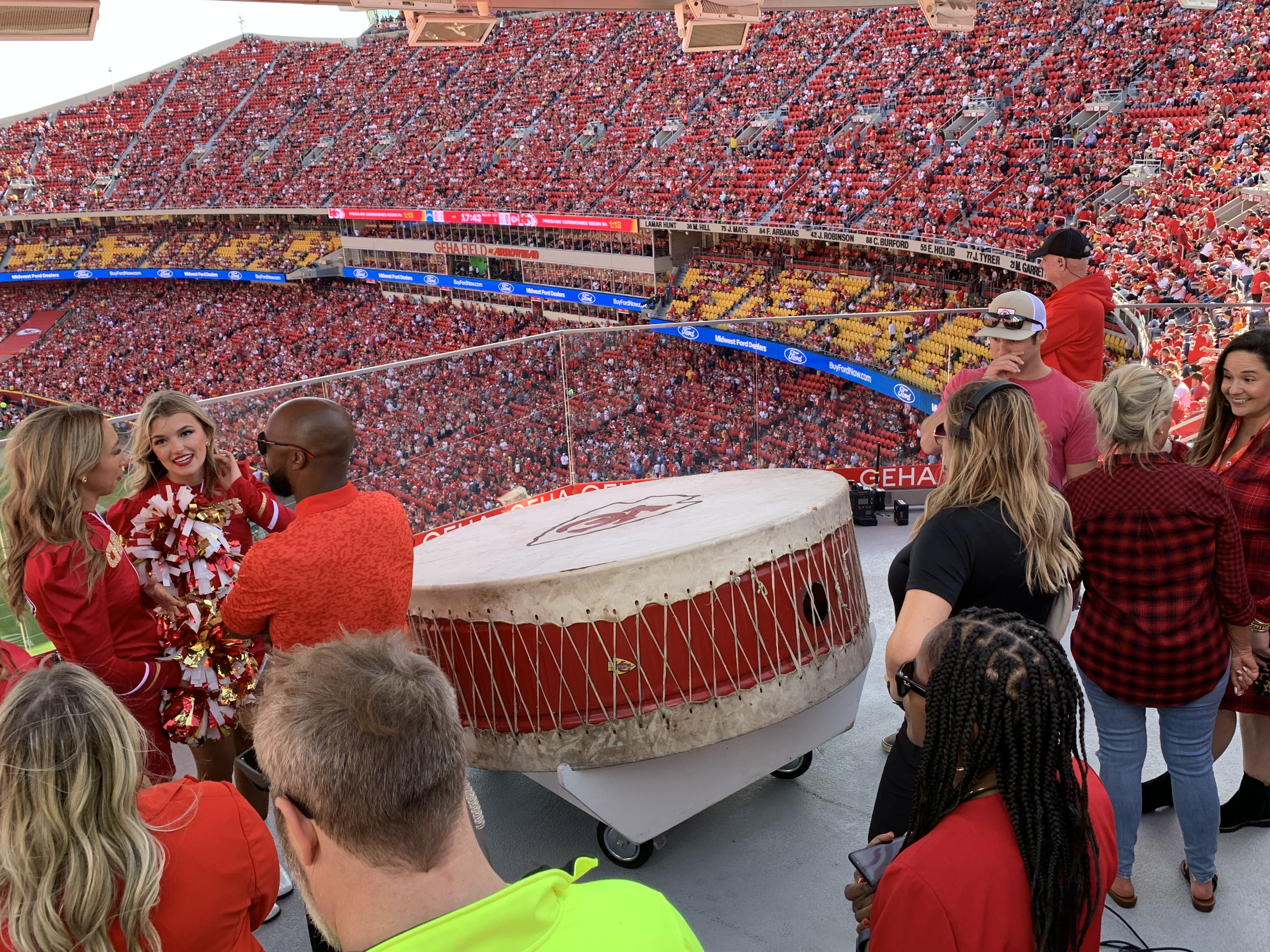
The drum used in the Chiefs’ chop

The Kansas City Chiefs are one of the professional sports teams involved in the controversy regarding the use of Native American names and imagery, but received less attention than other teams until 2013. That year, fan behavior at games–including the wearing of stereotypical headdresses and face paint, and the performance of a "war chant" and a tomahawk chop–became more publicly known. Protests by change advocates intensified following the name changes of the Washington Commanders and Cleveland Guardians. In addition, the Chiefs have been highly visible due to their participation in the Super Bowl in the 2019, 2020, 2022, 2023, and 2024 seasons and have received widespread media coverage. In 2023, Native American groups demonstrated outside the stadium hosting Super Bowl LVII.

The Kansas City Indian Center has called on the team to change the name and stop the tomahawk chop. Rhonda LeValdo (Acoma Pueblo), co-founder of Kansas City's Not In Our Honor Coalition, has called for a new team name and has described the tomahawk chop as synchronized racism. Deb Haaland, the first Indigenous US Secretary of the Interior has called on teams with tribal mascots to change mascots, including the Kansas City Chiefs.

The Chiefs' Chop

== History ==
The Kansas City Chiefs were the last professional sports team in the United States to adopt a name or logo referencing Native Americans, although indirectly. In 1963, the Dallas Texans (AFL) was renamed Chiefs in honor of Kansas City mayor Harold Roe Bartle who was instrumental in relocating the team to Kansas City, Missouri. Bartle, a non-Native, had been nicknamed "Chief" as founder of the Tribe of Mic-O-Say, a Boy Scouts honor camping society.

=== Mascots and traditions ===
In 1989, the Chiefs switched from Warpaint, a Pinto horse ridden by a man in a feathered headdress, to their current mascot K. C. Wolf. Warpaint returned in 2009, but was ridden by a cheerleader. In July 2021 Warpaint was again retired, the team president stating that it is the right thing to do at this time.

== Emergence of controversy ==
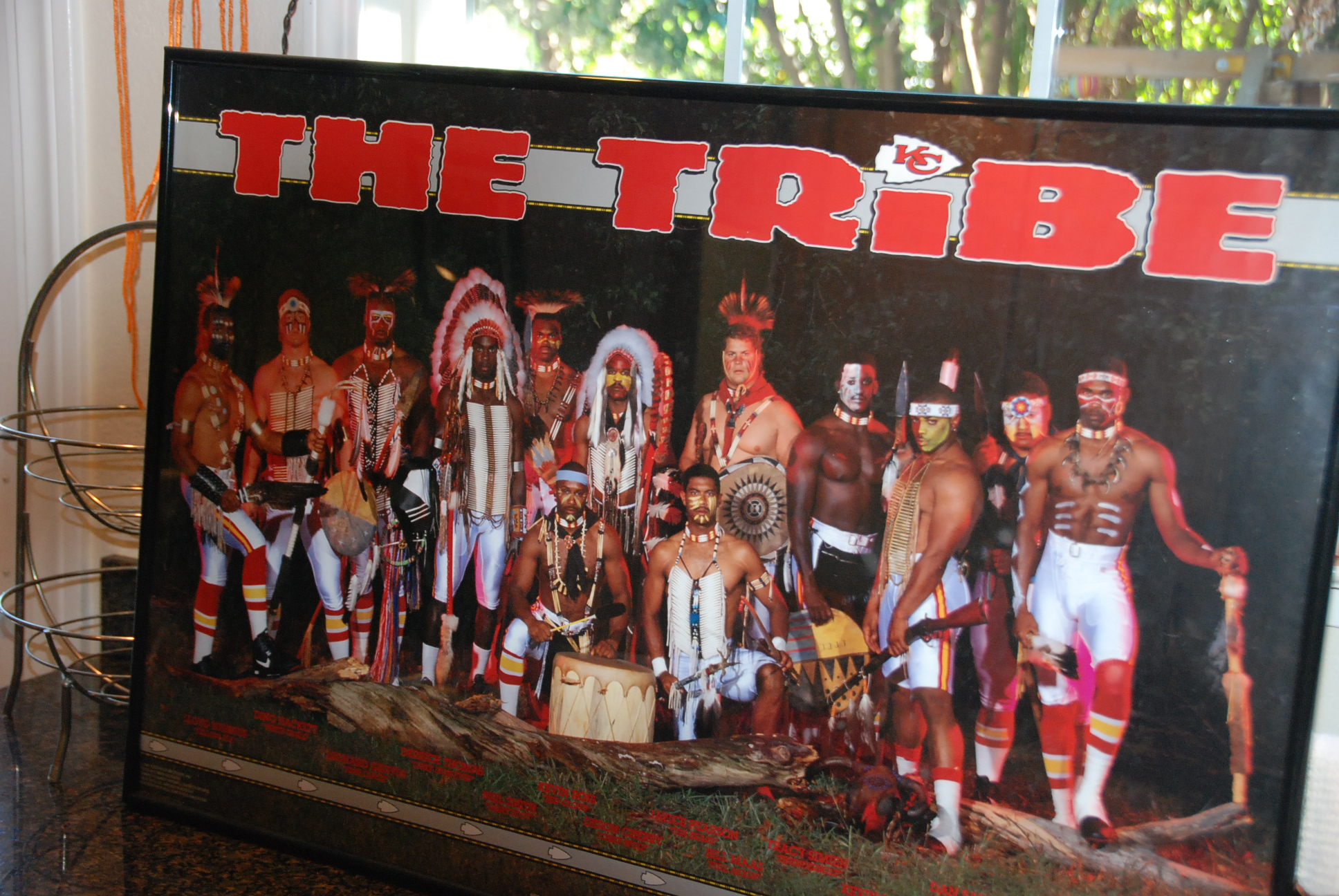
The 1991 Kansas City Chiefs Defense wore redface for charity

American Indian groups have called on sports teams, including the Chiefs, to change nicknames and mascots for many decades. The National Coalition on Racism in Sports and Media organized in 1991 following calls from Indigenous communities to end these practices.

Many did not take notice of these requests or the issue until much later. Following the appearance in the Kansas City Star of photographs of fans attending an October 2013 game wearing feathers and warpaint and doing the tomahawk chop, numerous Native Americans submitted complaints to the publication. One caller, who was especially upset that the photographs were published on Columbus Day, described the images as a "mockery" and "racist". Writing for the Star's "Public Editor" column, Derek Donovan explained that he found the complaints "reasonable" and suggested that the newspaper depict "other colorful, interesting people in the crowds."

The Kansas City Indian Center officially became involved in calling for change after a local restaurant in December 2013 had a sign widely condemned as racist that read “KC Chiefs Will Scalp the Redskins, Feed Them Whiskey, Send 2 Reservation.” The Kansas City Indian Center sent representatives to the restaurant owners to explain why the sign was unacceptable.

The Star reported in early August 2014 that the team's management was planning discussions with some Native American groups to find a non-confrontational way to eliminate, or at least reduce, offensive behavior. Amanda Blackhorse (Diné), the lead plaintiff in the trademark case against the Washington Redskins, said the real solution is a name change for the Chiefs. Blackhorse attended a protest at a game between the Kansas City Chiefs and the Washington Redskins at Arrowhead Stadium while she was a student at the University of Kansas, reporting "people yelled, 'Go back to your reservation!' 'We won, you lost, get over it!' 'Go get drunk!' And so many different slurs. People threw beers. That, to me, was shocking. I've experienced racism in my lifetime, but to see it outwardly, in the open, and nobody did anything? It was shocking."

Native Americans in Phoenix, Arizona picketed at the game between the Chiefs and the Arizona Cardinals, and have asked the Cardinals' management to bar "Redface", the wearing of headdresses and face paint, protesting what they perceive to be a mockery of Native American culture. A protest took place in Minnesota when the Chiefs played the Vikings on October 18, 2015. "The Kansas City Chiefs have flown under the radar," said Norma Renville, the executive director of Women of Nations Community Advocacy Program and Shelter. "They are contributing to our cultural genocide."

Native Americans at Haskell Indian Nations University in Lawrence, Kansas, asked the Chiefs to stop behavior that invokes stereotypes, such as wearing headdresses and doing the "tomahawk chop", after the team made the playoffs in 2016. While there have been efforts to address other issues, such as fans wearing warpaint and headdresses, the "chop" and the accompanying chant is defended by some local Native Americans. However, in a national survey, half of Native Americans said the "tomahawk chop" bothered or offended them, rising to 65% among those more engaged in Native traditions. In a statistical analysis of social media comments (tweets) leading up to Super Bowl LIV, researchers found many more negative terms associated with the Kansas City team compared to San Francisco. While both teams were referred to in terms related to violence, the Chiefs were much more likely to receive insults related to intelligence (being called stupid) and many insults were specific references to negative Native American stereotypes, such as drunkenness ("firewater"), and being inbred or extinct. The conclusion drawn was support for Natives being insulted, rather than honored, by Native American mascots.

== Response to changes by other teams ==
After the Washington Redskins and Cleveland Indians announced in July 2020 the process of reviewing their names, the Chiefs did not respond to a request for comment. The editorial board of the Kansas City Star stated that "It's time for a real examination of all of it: the tomahawk chop, the drum, Arrowhead Stadium, Warpaint, and the costumes worn by fans at the game." On August 20, 2020, the Chiefs announced that headdresses and Native American style face paint would be banned at Arrowhead Stadium. Under the new Arrowhead policy, the portion of the tomahawk chop led by Kansas City Chiefs cheerleaders was subtly modified, now required to lead the chop with a closed fist rather than the traditional open palm.

Deb Haaland, the first Indigenous US Secretary of the Interior has called on teams with tribal mascots to change mascots, including the Kansas City Chiefs. Despite Native American and national news media statements that they find the practices to be racist, the Chiefs continue many of the behaviors of other teams with Native American names, including fans wearing headdresses and warpaint, doing the tomahawk chop, and banging a drum. However, the ban of Native American headdresses and face paint at Arrowhead Stadium went into effect during the 2020 season opener on September 10, 2020.

== Renewed scrutiny during modern Super Bowl appearances ==
Before the kickoff of Super Bowl LV, members of the Florida Indigenous Rights and Environmental Equity (FIREE) protested for the termination of the Kansas City Chiefs name, chants, celebrations, and fan gear. Members of the group describe the use of the name and culture as "dishonorable and disrespectful." For years, fans have been known to wear headdresses and warpaint, mocking Native American culture. At the Raymond James Stadium where the protest occurred, protestors argued against the issue of the arrowhead, which is part of the team's logo that is plastered on fan gear and the team's uniforms. Protesters fought back at the mockery yelling "We're just saying if you're not going to honor us, don't use the arrowhead." and "you're mocking our people." Members of FIREE want to express their feelings of pain when teams appropriate their culture, saying “when you make indigenous people into a mascot, it's extremely dehumanizing, especially for children.” Part of the continuous frustration is caused by the lack of learning and listening from associations and their fans. Professor Rhonda LeValdo, from Haskell Indian Nations University expresses that the continuous appropriation of these customs is because "too many people don't care about Native Americans unless they can use our likeness for their companies, cars, or costumes." Alicia Norris, co-founder of FIREE, asks that “all human beings recognize that American Indians are Human Beings not sports team mascots for America's fun and games.” Along with disappointment and feelings of appropriation, there is a lack of correlation between the chants and fan gear, and the game itself. The Kansas City Star addressed the issue saying “we embrace the team's on field but don't think a corrosive chant has much to do with it. It isn't fair to ask groups offended by these symbols to wait even longer for change."

During the 2023 playoff season, the Kansas City Indian Center and the Not In Our Honor Coalition made a billboard near the stadium that said "Change The Name and Stop The Chop!" In advance of Super Bowl LVII, some name change advocates point out the continued discriminatory behaviors by fans in spite of official efforts to eradicate them, and the academic research establishing the harms inherent in any stereotyping. Others point to inclusion of Indigenous voices in the promotion of the game. Prior to notification of the protests, a decision was made to have the song "America the Beautiful" interpreted by Colin Denny (Navajo) in Plains Indian Sign Language, as a means of recognizing the number of tribes living in Arizona, the site of the game.

Protests continued when the Chiefs returned to the Super Bowl the following year for Super Bowl LVIII. After musician Taylor Swift started dating Chiefs tight end Travis Kelce in 2023 and gained widespread media attention, the Not in Our Honor Coalition expressed that they hope Taylor Swift speaks out about ending the chop.

In February 2024, Lily Gladstone (Siksikaitsitapi and Nimíipuu), who was the first Native American person to be nominated for an Academy Award for their role in Killers of the Flower Moon, spoke out about a long history of “exclusion and misrepresentation” of Native Americans in film and society. While acknowledging some gains, they pointed to one of the teams in the Super Bowl, noting “We haven't come that far if you look at one of the teams that's playing,” referring to the Chiefs and calling for an end to the chop and to change the team name.

Some in favor of change have suggested the Chiefs could potentially rebrand as the Fire Chiefs, the Monarchs, the Kings, the Wolves, or the Chefs, among others.

== See also ==
- Atlanta Braves tomahawk chop and name controversy
- Chicago Blackhawks name and logo controversy
- Tomahawk chop
