= Chicago Blackhawks name and logo controversy =

US pro hockey team racism controversy

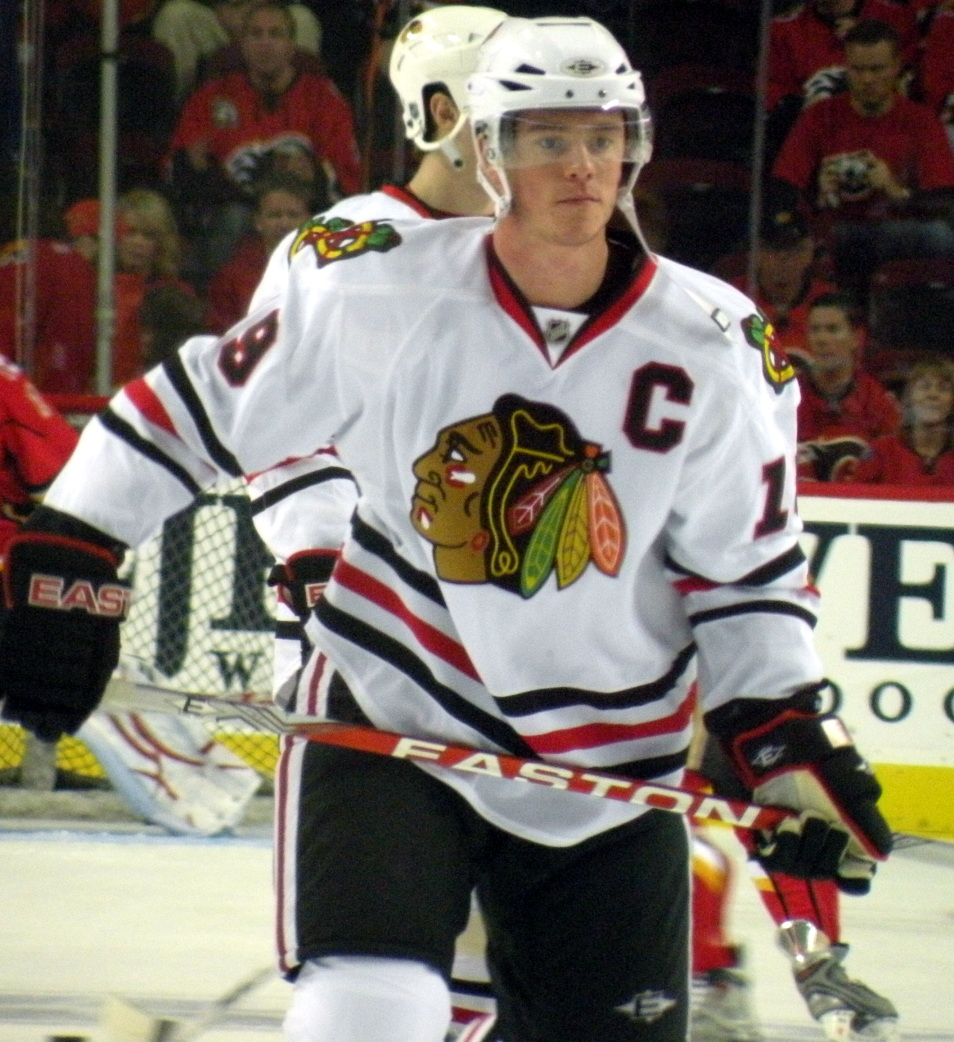
Jonathan Toews during the 2008–09 season, wearing a Chicago Blackhawks jersey that features the team's logo of a Native American head

There is an ongoing controversy surrounding the name and logo of the Chicago Blackhawks, a National Hockey League (NHL) ice hockey team based in Chicago, Illinois. Like other teams with tribal mascots, there are calls from Indigenous activists and organizations to change the Blackhawks' name and logo and eliminate tribal mascots and imagery throughout sports. According to team history, Blackhawk refers to the World War I-era 86th Training Division of the U.S. Army, which was named for prominent Illinois-based Sauk chief Black Hawk.

The National Congress of American Indians, the American Indian Center of Chicago, the Chi-Nations Youth Council, and over 1,500 Native organizations and advocates from over 150 federally recognized tribes across the country, including some members of the Sac and Fox Nation, support changing the team name and logo. Some members of Black Hawk's family have spoken out calling on the hockey team to change the team name and logo and cease from profiting off of Black Hawk’s name, image, and legacy. Since July 2020, headdresses have been banned from being worn at Blackhawk home games. The team has stated that they believe that both the name and logo symbolize the importance of Black Hawk's legacy. Chicago is home to the third largest Urban Indian population in the United States with 65,000 Native Americans in the Greater Chicagoland area with over 175 tribes represented. The team still maintains a collaborative partnership with Chief Black Hawk's Sac and Fox Nation tribe.

== History ==
The National Hockey League (NHL)'s Chicago Blackhawks was named in honor of the U.S. 86th Infantry Division, which was nicknamed the "Blackhawk Division" after Black Hawk, a Native American chief who was based in present-day Illinois; the team's founder, Frederic McLaughlin, having served in that division. The first logo was drawn by Irene Castle, who was white, in 1926.

Black Hawk was a leader of the Sauk who sided with the British in the War of 1812 and later attempted to regain tribal land in the Black Hawk War of 1832. Opponents of the logo say that adoption of his name for the 86th Infantry, the hockey team, and later for the Blackhawk helicopter are an example of designating certain Native Americans as "worthy adversaries."

=== Black Hawk and the Black Hawk War ===
Ma-Ka-Tai-Me-She-Kia-Kiak or Black Hawk was born in Saukenuk (modern-day Rock Island, Illinois). He was a Sac war leader. He fought with the British in the War of 1812 in hopes it would deter white settlement in his homelands.

He rejected the Treaty of St. Louis of 1804 which took his homelands and called for removal west of the Mississippi River.

In 1832, Black Hawk led an armed party of Sacs, Meskwakis (Foxes), Kickapoos, Ho-Chunk (Winnebagoes), and Potawatomis into his occupied homelands. This was in contrast with Sac Chief Keokuk who did not seek to confront the Americans. Black Hawk did not intend to start a war, but he was prepared to defend his homelands. His intention was to grow corn on his tribal homelands. Eventually, the Black Hawk War began, which was waged in modern-day Illinois and Wisconsin. During the war, his people faced starvation.

The five month Black Hawk War culminated into what has been described as a massacre and slaughter at the Battle of Bad Axe in its fifth month. Despite Black Hawk waving a white flag on the first day of the battle, US troops slaughtered 23 Indigenous people. On the second day, US troops shot at Indigenous women, children, and men for eight hours as they were crossing the river to escape as refugees into Iowa as well as fired on injured Indigenous people as they were drowning. Most of the 400 Indigenous people at the battle were killed. US troops scalped victims and tore skin off the backs of the dead. Jeffrey Ostler writes in the Journal of Genocide Research that "The slaughter at Bad Axe is clearly encompassed by Chalk and Jonassohn's definition of genocide as 'a form of one-sided mass killing in which a state or other authority intends to destroy a group'."

After the war, Black Hawk was taken prisoner of war under Lieutenant Jefferson Davis, who would later become President of the Confederate States of America. In his autobiography, Black Hawk described his imprisonment as torture. After the war, Andrew Jackson sent Black Hawk on a tour of eastern cities as a trophy of war to show the strength of the United States. Black Hawk attracted large crowds and grew in fame. However, in Detroit, crowds hanged and burned an effigy of Black Hawk. Black Hawk spent the last years of his life in Iowa with his family with the Sacs, where he died. After his death, his grave was robbed and his head was severed. The rest of his remains were stolen later. One historical account says that his remains were stored at a museum which burned down and were destroyed.

== Controversy ==
Suzan Shown Harjo (Cheyenne and Hodulgee Muscogee), who was awarded the US Presidential Medal of Freedom for decades of American Indian advocacy, including leading a lawsuit against Washington’s football team and restoring over 1 million acres of Indigenous land back, and is President of the Morning Star Institute and former Executive Director of the National Congress of American Indians, says the Blackhawks have escaped the scrutiny given to other teams using Native imagery because hockey is not a cultural force on the level of football or baseball. American Indian organizations have called for an end to all Indian-related mascots and that she found the hockey team's name and Indian head symbol to be offensive. "It lacks dignity", she said. "There's dignity in a school being named after a person or a people. There's dignity in a health clinic or hospital. There's nothing dignified in something being so named (that is used for) recreation or entertainment or fun." The National Congress of American Indians also opposes the Blackhawks' logo, as it does all Native American mascots. In 2010, sports columnist Damien Cox called on the franchise to retire the "racially insensitive" logo, saying that: "Clearly, no right-thinking person would name a team after an aboriginal figure these days any more than they would use Muslims or Africans or Chinese or any ethnic group to depict a specific sporting notion."

In 2013, WTTW interviewed Chicagoan Anthony Roy, First Nation Ojibway Tribe, who has called for a new logo and mascot, who said "You can't ignore the history of the time and the ideas and the ideology people of color faced during the creation of mascots. There was forced assimilation and cultural destruction. When the [physical] genocide of the Nation was over, cultural genocide starts. So while children were taken from their families, Native children ... this is alongside the history of sports and the births of sports leagues and many mascots. For instance the residential school my father attended that was around the time of the foundation of the Blackhawks."

In 2015, Mark Chipman, chairman of True North Sports & Entertainment, the owner of the NHL's Winnipeg Jets, decided to ban fake Native headdresses at games after meeting with First Nations leaders. The meeting took place in response to a complaint by a Jets fan after seeing a Blackhawks fan in a headdress.

In 2020, Anthony Tamez-Pochel (Cree, Lakota, Black), co-president of the Chi-Nations Youth Council, wrote in Teen Vogue about being Black and Indigenous in a city with a race-based mascot. "Being Indigenous in a place like Chicago can be tough. The assault of racist mascots and attempts to erase Native culture are constant and daunting. There are many multiracial Natives like myself who don't look like a stereotype, and because of this, our Native identities are often questioned or dismissed entirely. This experience erases a whole part of us and mentally breaks us down. ... Living in Chicago, we are constantly bombarded with the Blackhawks logo, which represents the city's professional ice hockey team."

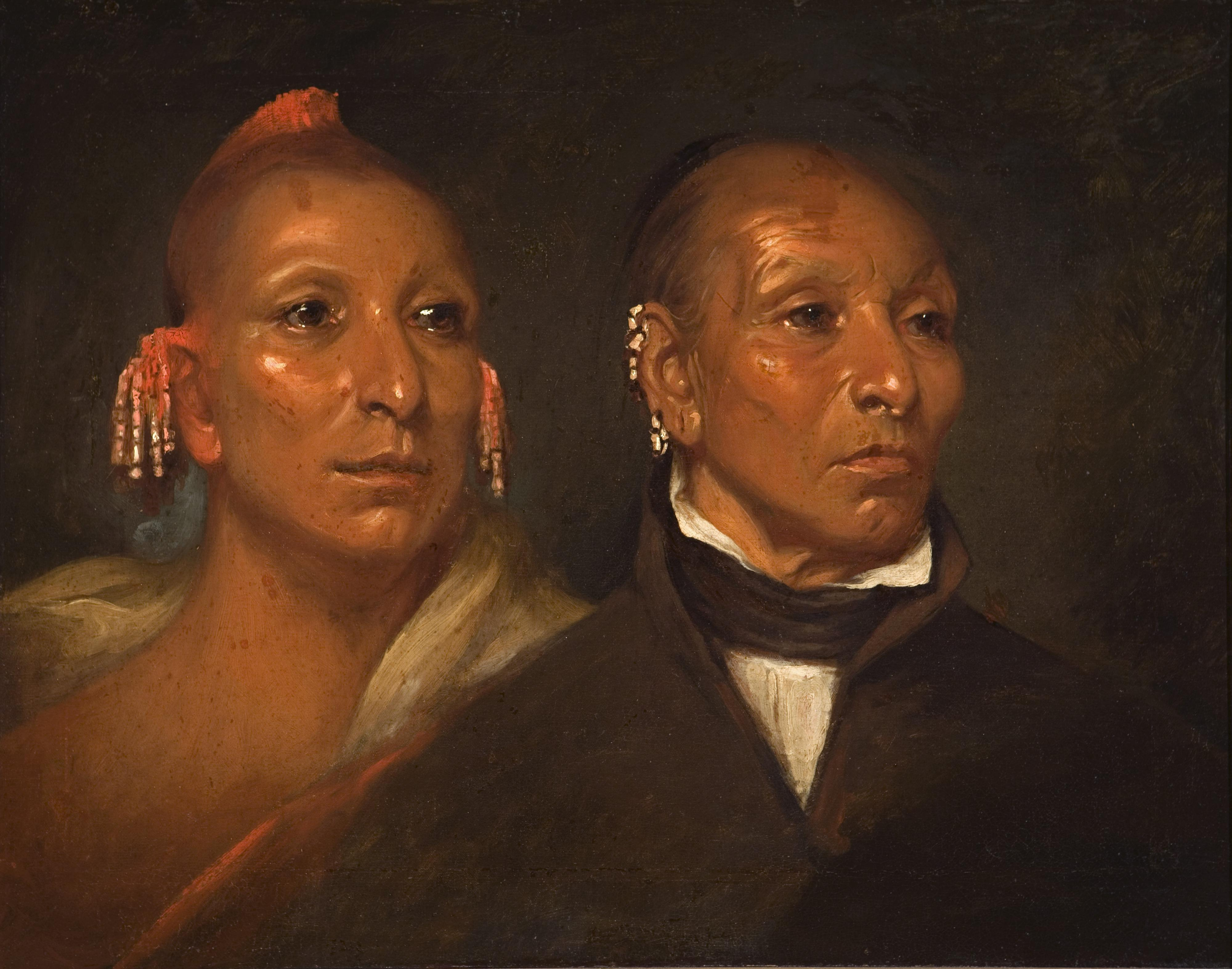
Black Hawk descendant April Holder contends the current Blackhawks logo is historically inaccurate, a "generic stereotype" and a "cartoon". According to her family, "Black Hawk and His Son Whirling Thunder" (1833), by John Wesley Jarvis is the most accurate depiction of Black Hawk. Black Hawk is on the right next to his son.

In 2024, in an interview with CBS, one of Black Hawk's lineal descendants, April Holder (Sauk and Fox, Wichita, Tonkawa), spoke out against the Chicago Blackhawks, calling on the team to stop use of its name and logo and to stop profiting off of her ancestor's identity and legacy. Holder said, "If someone were to come and take your name and use it for something and profit off of it, what is that called? It's called identity theft", she said. Referring to the logo, she said, "It's sickening, it's gross, it's grotesque, it's hurtful", she said. "[Black Hawk] was very eloquent, well spoken, and extremely intelligent ... he was just a man who wanted to do right by his people." Holder said that to her knowledge, the team has never asked her family for permission and if they had asked, her family would not give approval. "There are things that are not for sale. The dignity of my tribe, my people, and my ancestor's legacy are not for sale." Holder said his identity is "not for a team to use". "It belongs to our people. It belongs to my family. It belongs to that legacy of the people he fought for", she said. "Black Hawk did not make those sacrifices for some hockey team to exploit and profit off him. That was not what he created a legacy for. He created it so that future generations like my child and myself could exist." During the interview, Holder also referenced the Black Hawk War, saying, "(The United States) massacred our people there, they massacred women and children there ... It's not enough for us to experience genocide, basically. It's like, now we have to take even your names from you. We have to take the legacy of your people away from you."

== Addressing the controversy ==
The Blackhawks have worked with the American Indian Center (AIC) to help inform their community and fan base by sharing Native American culture and history. In 2013, Scott Sypolt, Executive Counsel for the American Indian Center weighed in on the logo and name controversy by stating, "There is a consensus among us that there's a huge distinction between a sports team called the Redskins depicting native people as red, screaming, ignorant savages and a group like the Blackhawks honoring Black Hawk, a true Illinois historical figure."

However, this stance is markedly different from the one previously taken by the American Indian Center, with the shift coming only in the past few years after other, more offensive mascots were successfully retired. In 2010, for instance, Joe Podlasek stated that, "The stance is very clear. We want the Chicago Blackhawks logo to change. For us, that's one of our grandfathers. Would you do that with your grandfather's picture? Take it and throw it on a rug? Walk on it and dance on it?" John Blackhawk, Chairman of the Winnebago Tribe of Nebraska, has suggested that the change in position for the AIC may be connected to contributions the Blackhawks organization has recently begun making to the center: "We all do contributions, but we don't do it for the sake of wanting to be forgiven for something we've done that's offensive."

In 2019, the American Indian Center of Chicago ended all ties to the Chicago Blackhawks Foundation, stating they will no longer affiliate "with organizations that perpetuate stereotypes through the use of 'Indian' mascots." The AIC noted in its statement that they "previously held a relationship with the Chicago Blackhawks Foundation with the intention of educating the general public about American Indians and the use of logos and mascots. The AIC, along with members of the community have since decided to end this relationship" and stated that "going forward, AIC will have no professional ties with the Blackhawks, or any other organization that perpetuates harmful stereotypes."

After the Washington Redskins announced that they would be changing their name in July 2020, the Blackhawks confirmed that they would continue to use their team name. However, the team did agree to ban Native American headdresses at home games held in the United Center in recognition of being sacred symbols. Before the ban was enacted, there had in fact been incidents where some Blackhawk fans wore headdresses. After the Cleveland Indians announced in December 2020 that the team would change their name after the 2021 season, new CEO Danny Wirtz reiterated that the Blackhawks would not change.

The Chi-Nations Youth Council (CNYC), an Indigenous youth organization in Chicago, said in 2020, "The Chicago Blackhawks name and logo symbolizes a legacy of imperialism and genocide." "As statues of invaders, slave holders, and white supremacists fall across the nation so too should the images and language of the savage and dead 'Indians'." CNYC also noted "As social consciousness has grown over the past decades so has the Blackhawks performative gestures of buying their reprieve from those willing to sell out the health and humanity of our future generations."

Despite this opposition, as of 2022, the Blackhawks have stated their intent to keep the name and imagery, along with their belief that they "honor and celebrate legacy of Black Hawk" and that the name and logo "symbolizes this important and historic person." Their website states that they are working on "educating our staff, fans and local community on the history of Black Hawk and original peoples of Illinois, as well as on Native American contributions to today's society." The website also lists several Native American groups and individuals they donate money to, or hire to do artwork, and posts stories about various Native Americans who are considered members of the "Blackhawks community."

As of 2025, the team still maintains a partnership with Chief Black Hawk's Sac and Fox Nation tribe. The partnership involves collaboration on various issues, including land acknowledgement, grant programs, collaborative exhibits and installations, language preservation projects, game day materials, resources invested in identifying future opportunities and ways to ensure transparency between both parties.

It has been suggested by Chicago Tribune columnist David McGrath that the Chicago Blackhawks could rebrand as the Chicago Hawks or the Chicago Red-Tailed Hawks. The Blackhawks are also commonly referred to as the Hawks. Ojibwa artist Mike Ivall created a possible replacement logo featuring a hawk with a similar color scheme as the Blackhawks primary logo (Black, red, green, yellow, orange). Anthony Roy (Ojibwe and M'Chigeeng First Nation), an Indigenous fan of the team created a Facebook page with the title “This should be the Blackhawks Logo!” with Ivall’s design in the profile picture, which caught media attention. The proposed logo was sold to the AAA hockey team Maplesoft Hawks in Ottawa.

== See also ==
- Washington Redskins name controversy
- Cleveland Indians name and logo controversy
- Kansas City Chiefs name controversy
- Atlanta Braves tomahawk chop and name controversy
