= List of sports team names and mascots derived from indigenous peoples =

Though such mascots and names may seem trivial today, they are rooted in a legacy of assimilationist policies that reduced Indigenous cultures to simplified, non-threatening images for consumption. The practice of deriving sports team names, imagery, and mascots from Indigenous peoples of North America is a significant phenomenon in the United States and Canada. From early European colonization onward, Indigenous peoples faced systematic displacement, violence, and cultural suppression, all intended to erode sovereignty and claim their lands for settlers. The popularity of stereotypical representations of American Indians in global culture has led to a number of teams in Europe also adopting team names derived from Native Americans. While there are team names in North America derived from other ethnic groups, such as the Boston Celtics, the New York Yankees, the Montreal Canadiens, and the Notre Dame Fighting Irish, these are names selected by groups to represent themselves.

Globally, there are teams in Africa and Europe that use Native American images and logos, while in South America there are a number of teams that reference the Guaraní people. In Brazil, these teams may be referred to using the derogatory term "bugre". The "Indian Wars" of the 17th to 19th centuries, in which the U.S. government authorized forced removals, land confiscations, and military campaigns against Indigenous nations, reinforced the view of Native Americans as an "enemy" to be conquered. However, the adoption of Indigenous names in Asia, Africa, Australia and South America may indicate that the team members are themselves Indigenous.

The rise of Indigenous rights movements has led to controversy regarding the continuation of practices rooted in colonialism. Using Indigenous names and mascots, like the former Washington Commanders name, extends beyond racial insensitivity; it reinforces colonialism and erases Indigenous identity and land. Such practices maintain the power relationship between the dominant culture and the Indigenous culture, and can be seen as a form of cultural imperialism. Policymakers formalized Indigenous erasure in the U.S. through measures like the Indian Removal Act of 1830, which forcibly relocated thousands of Indigenous people, and the Dawes Act of 1887, which divided Indigenous communal lands. Such practices are seen as particularly harmful in schools and universities, which have the stated purpose of promoting ethnic diversity and inclusion.

In recognition of the responsibility of higher education to eliminate behaviors that creates a hostile environment for education, in 2005 the NCAA initiated a policy against "hostile and abusive" names and mascots that led to the change of many derived from Native American culture, with the exception of those that established an agreement with particular tribes for the use of their specific names. Other schools retain their names because they were founded for the education of Native Americans, and continue to have a significant number of Indigenous students. Though often framed as a racial issue, Kevin Bruyneel suggests that the debate over sports team names more accurately reflects a larger colonial agenda. He argues that these symbols remind us of Indigenous dispossession while marginalizing authentic Indigenous voices and histories.

The trend towards the elimination of Indigenous names and mascots in local schools has been steady, with two thirds having been eliminated over the past 50 years according to the National Congress of American Indians (NCAI). Founded in 1879, the Carlisle Indian Industrial School was part of a broader assimilation policy aimed at "killing the Indian, saving the man" by erasing Indigenous cultures and replacing them with Euro-American norms. In a few states with significant Native American populations, change has been mandated by law, such in Maine, Wisconsin, Oregon, and Washington.

These policies dispossessed Indigenous people of their land and aimed to erase their cultural identities. Little League International has updated its 2019 rulebook to include a statement prohibiting "the use of team names, mascots, nicknames or logos that are racially insensitive, derogatory or discriminatory in nature." This decision has been applauded by the National Congress of American Indians. These representations reinforce a colonial mindset by portraying Indigenous people as static historical figures rather than as contemporary, diverse communities.

The Red Power Movement of the 1960s and 1970s, supported by groups like the American Indian Movement (AIM), challenged stereotypes, advocated for Indigenous sovereignty, and fought to end offensive Indigenous mascots. This period was critical in challenging colonial representations in mainstream culture, asserting Indigenous voices against centuries of imposed imagery. Only by acknowledging these colonial dynamics can society move toward respectful, non-exploitative representations of Indigenous peoples.

== Professional/Adult teams ==
=== Current usage ===
==== American football ====
- Bristol Aztecs (British American Football League) - Bristol, England
- Bürstadt Redskins, an American Football club in Bürstadt, Germany
- Eberswalder Warriors, an American Football club in Eberswalde, Germany
- Garland Aztecs, Garland, Texas - Semi-Pro
- Mayas CDMX (Liga de Fútbol Americano Profesional) - Mexico City, Mexico
- Mexicas CDMX (Liga de Fútbol Americano Profesional) - Mexico City, Mexico
- Kansas City Chiefs (NFL) - While adopting Native American imagery, the team was named in honor of Kansas City mayor Harold Roe Bartle who was instrumental in bringing the AFL Dallas Texans to Kansas City in 1963 (becoming the last professional team to adopt an Indigenous-derived name). Bartle earned his nickname as founder of the Tribe of Mic-O-Say, a regional Boy Scouts honor camping society in which he was "Chief" Lone Bear. In 1989, the Chiefs switched from Warpaint, a Pinto horse ridden by a man in a feathered headdress, to their current mascot K. C. Wolf. Warpaint returned in 2009, but is ridden by a cheerleader.
- Southern California Apaches - (Semi-Pro, United Football Alliance League)
- Central Michigan Chippewas (American College Football) NCAA Division I Football Bowl Subdivision (FBS) of the National Collegiate Athletic Association (NCAA) and the Mid-American Conference (MAC)
- Florida State Seminoles (American College Football) NCAA Division I Football Bowl Subdivision (FBS) of the National Collegiate Athletic Association (NCAA) and the Atlantic Division of the Atlantic Coast Conference (ACC)
- Utah Utes (American College Football) NCAA Division I Football Bowl Subdivision (FBS) of the National Collegiate Athletic Association (NCAA) and the South Division of the Pac-12 Conference (Pac-12)

===== American 7s Football League =====
- New Jersey Savage
- Spanktown Boyz - Uses a Native American wielding a tomahawk as its logo
- Union City Chiefs

==== Association football ====
Belgium

- K.A.A. Gent (Belgian First Division A), Ghent, East Flanders - Known as the Buffaloes, the team uses an Indian head logo and a mascot in faux Native costume.

Brazil

- Guarani Esporte Clube (CE), Juazeiro do Norte
- Guarani Esporte Clube (MG), Divinópolis
- Guarani Futebol Clube, Campinas
- Guarany Futebol Clube, Bagé
- Guarany Futebol Clube (Camaquã)
- Guarany Sporting Club, Sobral
- Associação Atlética Guarany, Porto da Folha
- Esporte Clube Guarani, Venâncio Aires
- Sociedade Esportiva, Recreativa e Cultural Guarani, Palhoça
- Sport Club Guarany, Cruz Alta
- Tupi Football Club, Juiz de Fora
- Tupynambás Futebol Clube, Juiz de Fora

Chile

- Colo-Colo, Santiago de Chile. Name relates to the Mapuche
- Lautaro, Buin. Also called Guerreros de Buín (Warriors Buín)

Ecuador

- Sociedad Deportiva Aucas, Quito - Auca (Quechuan for savage) is pejorative name for the Huaorani people

Paraguay

- Club Guaraní, Asunción

South Africa

- Kaizer Chiefs F.C., Johannesburg Barrett doin

==== Australian rules football ====
All of these teams are composed of Indigenous Australians.

- Flying Boomerangs (Australia), in reference to the boomerang, an Indigenous Australian hunting tool and instrument.
- Indigenous All Stars (Australia), formerly known as the Aboriginal All-Stars

==== Baseball ====
- Gauting Indians, a baseball and softball club from Gauting, a suburb of Munich, Germany. The women's team is the "Squaws".
- Indios del Bóer ("Indians of the Boer"), Managua, Nicaragua. They are known as la tribu, "the tribe".

===== Major league =====
- Atlanta Braves (Atlanta, Georgia) - originally Boston Braves, then Milwaukee Braves. The mascot Chief Noc-A-Homa existed until the 1983 season. Princess Win-A-Lotta was introduced in the late 1970s, dropped at same time as Noc-A-Homa. In 1991, the Braves adopted the Tomahawk Chop from Florida State University when Deion Sanders joined the team.
- Caribes de Anzoátegui (Puerto la Cruz, Venezuela) - While Caribe is another name for the Kalina people, it is also a local term for piranhas, particularly in Venezuela. The team has no apparent use of Indigenous imagery.
- Indios de Mayagüez - (Indians of Mayaguez) Puerto Rican Baseball team from Mayagüez, Puerto Rico.
- Mayos de Navojoa (Navojoa, Sonora, Mexico) - The Mayo people are Indigenous to Sonora
- Yaquis de Obregón (Ciudad Obregón, Sonora, Mexico) - The Yaqui are Indigenous to Sonora

===== Minor league =====
A Minor league team in Innisfail, Alberta, the "Indians", has made a decision to become the "Trappers".

Affiliates of the Atlanta Braves:

- Florida Complex League Braves (North Port, Florida)

Affiliate of the Pittsburgh Pirates:

- Indianapolis Indians (Indianapolis, Indiana) - Team announced partnership with Miami Tribe to keep mascot.

Affiliate of the Colorado Rockies:

- Spokane Indians (Spokane, Washington)

==== Basketball ====
All three existing National Basketball Association teams that previously used Indigenous imagery have stopped doing so. (See Prior usage list below).

- Bendigo Braves (Bendigo, Victoria) play in the South East Australian Basketball League
- Guaiqueríes de Margarita, (LPB) - named after an Indigenous people of Northern Venezuela also known as the Waikerí.
- Indios de Ciudad Juárez, Mexico (Liga Nacional de Baloncesto Profesional)
- Indios de Mayagüez, (Puerto Rico Superior Basketball League)
- Quilmes de Mar del Plata, Argentina, (LLA) - named after the Quilmes, an Indigenous people of Northern Argentina.

==== Ice hockey ====
- Chelmsford Chieftains (NIHL), Chelmsford, Essex, United Kingdom
- Chicago Blackhawks (NHL)
- Chilliwack Chiefs (BCHL) - While retaining their name, the team retired their mascot "Chief Wannawin". The chief of a local First Nation applauded the move but was disappointed the mascot was part of the team for 20 years.
- Hannover Indians (German Oberliga)
- Malmö Redhawks (Swedish Hockey League)
- Memmingen Indians (German Oberliga)
- HC Škoda Plzeň, Czech Republic (Czech Extraliga) uses a Native American logo.
- Seattle Thunderbirds (WHL)
- Shawinigan Cataractes (QMJHL)
- Spokane Chiefs (WHL)
- Whitley Warriors (NIHL), Whitley Bay, United Kingdom.

==== Indoor soccer ====
- Chihuahua Savage (MASL)

==== Lacrosse ====
- Alberta Lacrosse Association
  - Rocky Mountain Lacrosse League
    - Junior B Lacrosse
      - Edmonton Warriors - Indian head logo
- Ontario Lacrosse Association
  - Major Series Lacrosse:
    - Six Nations Chiefs, Six Nations of the Grand River
  - Senior B Lacrosse
    - Six Nations Rivermen - Logo is an Indian paddling a canoe
  - Junior A Lacrosse
    - Burlington Chiefs, Burlington, Ontario
    - Mississauga Tomahawks
  - Junior B Lacrosse
    - Elora Mohawks, Elora, Ontario
- Quebec Senior Lacrosse
  - Kahnawake Mohawks - Cartoon Indian head logo
  - Kahnawake Tomahawks - Indian head logo
- West Coast Senior Lacrosse Association (WSCLA), British Columbia - The Association logo features an "Indian Head"
  - Coquitlam Adanacs - Although "adanac" is Canada spelled backward, their logo features a First Nations woman.
  - Langley Warriors
  - North Shore Indians

==== Rugby union ====
- The Chiefs, formerly the Waikato Chiefs (North Island of New Zealand) - a rugby union side in the Super Rugby competition. Their logo is a male figure holding a Māori club.
- Griquas, South African team named after the Griqua people, however their symbol is an oryx.
- Māori All Blacks, previously the New Zealand Māori, a rugby union side whose members must be at least 1/16 Māori
- Northland Taniwha, a rugby team in the Mitre 10 Cup named after a being from Māori mythology

==== Rugby league ====
- Indigenous All Stars a.k.a. Indigenous All Stars or Indigenous Dreamtime. Dreamtime is an Indigenous Australian religious/mythological term.
- New Zealand Māori rugby league team
- The New Zealand Warriors, (Auckland, New Zealand), plays in the Australian NRL competition. The team logo indicates the "Warrior" is an Indigenous reference.

==== Other ====
- Indianerna (the Indians) are a Swedish motorcycle speedway team based in Kumla, Sweden at (Elitserien)

== Prior pro usage ==
Many professional teams changed because they moved to another city, or went out of business ("Defunct" in table below).

Team name	Sport/League	City, State	Year Changed	New Name	Notes
Akron Indians	National Football League	Akron, Ohio	Defunct	Akron Pros	Changed back to the Indians in 1926, then folded.
Brooklin Redmen	Major Series Lacrosse	Whitby, Ontario	2019	Brooklin Lacrosse Club	
Buffalo Braves	National Basketball Association	Buffalo, New York	1978	Los Angeles Clippers	Also the San Diego Clippers.
Burlington Indians	Minor League Baseball	Burlington, North Carolina	2006	Burlington Sock Puppets	Changed affiliation from Cleveland Indians to Kansas City Royals.
Canton–Akron Indians	Minor League Baseball	Canton, Ohio	1997	Akron Aeros	Rebranded upon relocation from Canton to Akron in 1997.
Cleveland Indians	Major League Baseball	Cleveland, Ohio	2021	Cleveland Guardians	Were known as the Cleveland Indians from 1915 to 2021. Officially became the Cleveland Guardians on November 19, 2021.
Cleveland Indians (1921)	National Football League	Cleveland, Ohio		Defunct	
Cleveland Indians (1931)	National Football League	Cleveland, Ohio		Defunct	
Danville Braves	Minor League Baseball	Danville, Virginia	2020		Appalachian League, including Danville baseball club, no longer affiliated with Atlanta Braves.
Duluth Eskimos	National Football League	Duluth, Minnesota	1927	Defunct	Also known as the Duluth "Kelleys".
Edmonton Eskimos	Canadian Football League	Edmonton, Alberta	2021	Edmonton Elks	Renamed as the Edmonton Elks in 2021.
Exeter Chiefs	Premiership Rugby (Rugby union)	Exeter, Devon, England	2022	NA	Keeping their name, but American Indian logo replaced by an image that reflects Celtic origins.
Flint Indians	Michigan Baseball League	Flint, Michigan	1941	N/A	
Frölunda Indians	Swedish Hockey League	Gothenburg, Sweden	2021	Frölunda HC	Renamed as Frölunda HC in 2021.
Golden State Warriors	National Basketball Association	San Francisco, California	1971	N/A	Originally Philadelphia Warriors, then San Francisco Warriors, dropped Indian imagery when they moved to Oakland.
Gwinnett Braves	International League	Lawrenceville, Georgia	2017	Gwinnett Stripers	Originally Richmond Braves, renamed as Gwinnett Braves upon move, rebranded after 2017 season. The Stripers continue to be the Triple-A affiliate of the Atlanta Braves.
Indios de Ciudad Juarez	Minor League Baseball	Ciudad Juárez, Chihuahua, Mexico	1984	Defunct	
Indios de Ciudad Juarez	Liga de Expansión MX	Ciudad Juárez, Chihuahua, Mexico	2011	Dissolved	
Johnstown Chiefs	ECHL	Johnstown, Pennsylvania	2010	Dissolved	Changed to Greenville Road Warriors, 2015 changed to Greenville Swamp Rabbits
Kansas City Scouts	National Hockey League	Kansas City, Missouri	1976	Now the New Jersey Devils	First moved to Colorado and became the "Rockies".
Kinston Indians	Minor League Baseball	Kinston, North Carolina	2012	N/A	Replaced by the Carolina Mudcats.
Mexico City Aztecas	Continental Basketball Association	Mexico City		Defunct	Only one season: 1994–95.
Mississippi Braves	Southern League (Minor League Baseball)	Pearl, Mississippi	2024	Columbus Clingstones	Retained Atlanta Braves affiliation
Moose Jaw Warriors	Western Hockey League	Moose Jaw, Saskatchewan	2021	N/A	Name retained, but Native American logo replaced by airplane.
Oorang Indians	National Football League	LaRue, Ohio	1923	Defunct	Consisting mostly of Native Americans.
Ottawa Tomahawks	National Basketball League of Canada	Ottawa	2013	Ottawa SkyHawks	Name changed shortly after announced due to controversy, team folded after one season.
Portland Chinooks	International Basketball League	Portland, Oregon	2014	Folded	
Portland Winterhawks	Western Hockey League	Portland, Oregon	2021	N/A	Name retained, but Native American logo replaced by Hawk.
Rome Braves	South Atlantic League	Rome, Georgia	2023	Rome Emperors	
Salisbury Indians	Minor League Baseball	Salisbury, Maryland		Defunct	
Sheboygan Red Skins	Basketball	Sheboygan, Wisconsin	1952	Defunct	
Springfield Indians	American Hockey League	Peoria, Illinois		Rivermen	First moved to Worcester and became the IceCats.
St. Regis Indians	Major Series Lacrosse	Akwesasne	2009	Folded	
Streatham Redskins	NIHL South Division 1	London, England	2016	Streatham Ice Hockey Club	
Swift Current Indians	Western Major Baseball League (East Division)	Swift Current, Saskatchewan, Canada	2017	Swift Current 57's	The team dropped the "Indians" name in 2016.
Syracuse Chiefs	Minor League Baseball	Syracuse, New York	2019	Syracuse Mets	New York Mets ownership dropped the "Chiefs" name for the 2019 season.
Toronto Tecumsehs	National Hockey Association	Toronto, Ontario	1913	Toronto Ontarios	Renamed the Toronto Shamrocks in 1915 and ceased operations later that year.
Tri-Cities Blackhawks	National Basketball Association	Moline, Illinois	1951	Atlanta Hawks	Team was also the Milwaukee & St. Louis "Hawks".
Washington Redskins	National Football League	Landover, Maryland (Home Field) and Ashburn, Virginia (Headquarters)	2020	Washington Commanders	Washington Football Team served as the interim team name for two years until February 2, 2022, when the new name "Commanders" was officially chosen. Also see Washington Redskins name controversy.

== Non-scholastic youth teams ==
=== Baseball ===
- American Indian Little League, Palmdale, California
- Dornbirn Indians, Redskins, and "Little Indians", a youth baseball club in Austria.
- Skokie Indians, Skokie, Illinois
- Whalley Chiefs, Surrey, British Columbia (British Columbia Premier Baseball League)

=== Association football ===
- Raynes Park Little League, Kensington, England - Redskins

=== American football ===
==== Pop Warner Little Scholars ====
- Albemarle Redskins, Albemarle County, Virginia
- Antioch Redskins, Plant City, Florida
- Bennetts Creek Warriors, Suffolk, Virginia
- Derby Red Raiders, Derby, Connecticut
- East Bay Warriors, Oakland, California
- Fort Braden Chiefs, Fort Braden, Florida
- FW Redskins, Goodyear, Arizona
- Immokalee Seminoles, Immokalee, Florida
- Lower Sussex Indians, Sussex County, Delaware
- Nonnewaug Chiefs, Woodbury, Connecticut
- Oak Cliff Redskins, Dallas, Texas
- Pomperaug Warriors, Southbury, Connecticut
- Reynolds Corner Redskins, Toledo, Ohio
- Southeast Apaches, San Antonio, Texas
- Southland Comanches, Colorado
- Stratford Redskin, Stratford, Connecticut
- Water Oak Indians, Watertown, Connecticut
- Western Albemarle Chiefs, Crozet, Virginia
- Willamette Redskins, Eugene, Oregon

==== Youth/Junior football ====
- Antioch Redskins, Plant City, Florida
- CLCF Football, Cranston, Rhode Island (Chiefs)
- Catawissa Redskins, Catawissa, Pennsylvania
- Donaldsonville Redskins, Donaldsonville, Louisiana
- Fauquier Youth Football, Fauquier County, Virginia
- Grayling Redskins Youth Football, Grayling, Michigan
- Kanawha Youth Football Redskins, Richmond, Virginia
- Lancaster Junior Redskins, Lancaster, New York
- Loudon Redskins Youth Football, Loudon, Tennessee
- Patterson Redskins Youth Football & Cheer, Patterson, California
- Rochester Redskins Youth Football & Cheer, Rochester, Michigan
- Sarasota Ringling Redskins, Sarasota, Florida
- South Cherokee Football and Cheer "Redskins", Woodstock, Georgia
- Southwest Redskins, Houston, Texas
- Sterling Heights Redskins, Sterling Heights, Michigan
- Vienna Youth Inc. Football Chiefs, Vienna, Virginia
- Washington Redskins Midget Football, Washington, New Jersey
- Whittier Redskins, Whittier, California
- Woonsocket Redskins Youth Football and Cheerleading, Woonsocket, Rhode Island

=== Ice Hockey ===
- Chilliwack Chiefs, Chilliwack, British Columbia (British Columbia Hockey League)
- Copper Cliff Redmen, Copper Cliff, Ontario Team name has changed to the 'Reds' July 2019 CBC article
- Johnstown Tomahawks, Johnstown, Pennsylvania (North American Hockey League)
- Onion Lake Border Chiefs, Onion Lake Cree Nation
- Saddle Lake Warriors, Saddle Lake, Alberta
- Tavistock Braves, Tavistock, Ontario

=== Lacrosse ===
- Akwesasne Indians, Akwesasne, a Mohawk Nation that intersects the United States and Canada
- Elora Mohawks, Elora, Ontario
- Kitchener-Waterloo Braves, Kitchener, Ontario
- Kahnawake Hunters, Kahnawake, Quebec
- Mississauga Tomahawks, Mississauga, Ontario
- Six Nations Arrows, Hagersville, Ontario
- Six Nations Rebels, Hagersville, Ontario
- Six Nations Warriors, Hagersville, Ontario
- Tomahawks, Palo Alto, California
- Whitby Warriors, Whitby, Ontario

=== Wrestling ===
- Little Redskins, Illinois Kids Wrestling Federation (IKWF) sanctioned club (K-8th grade) in Morris, Illinois – Uses a version of the DC team logo

== See also ==
- Native American mascot controversy
- List of company and product names derived from Indigenous peoples
- List of contemporary ethnic groups
- List of Indigenous peoples
