= Foam hand =

Sports paraphernalia item

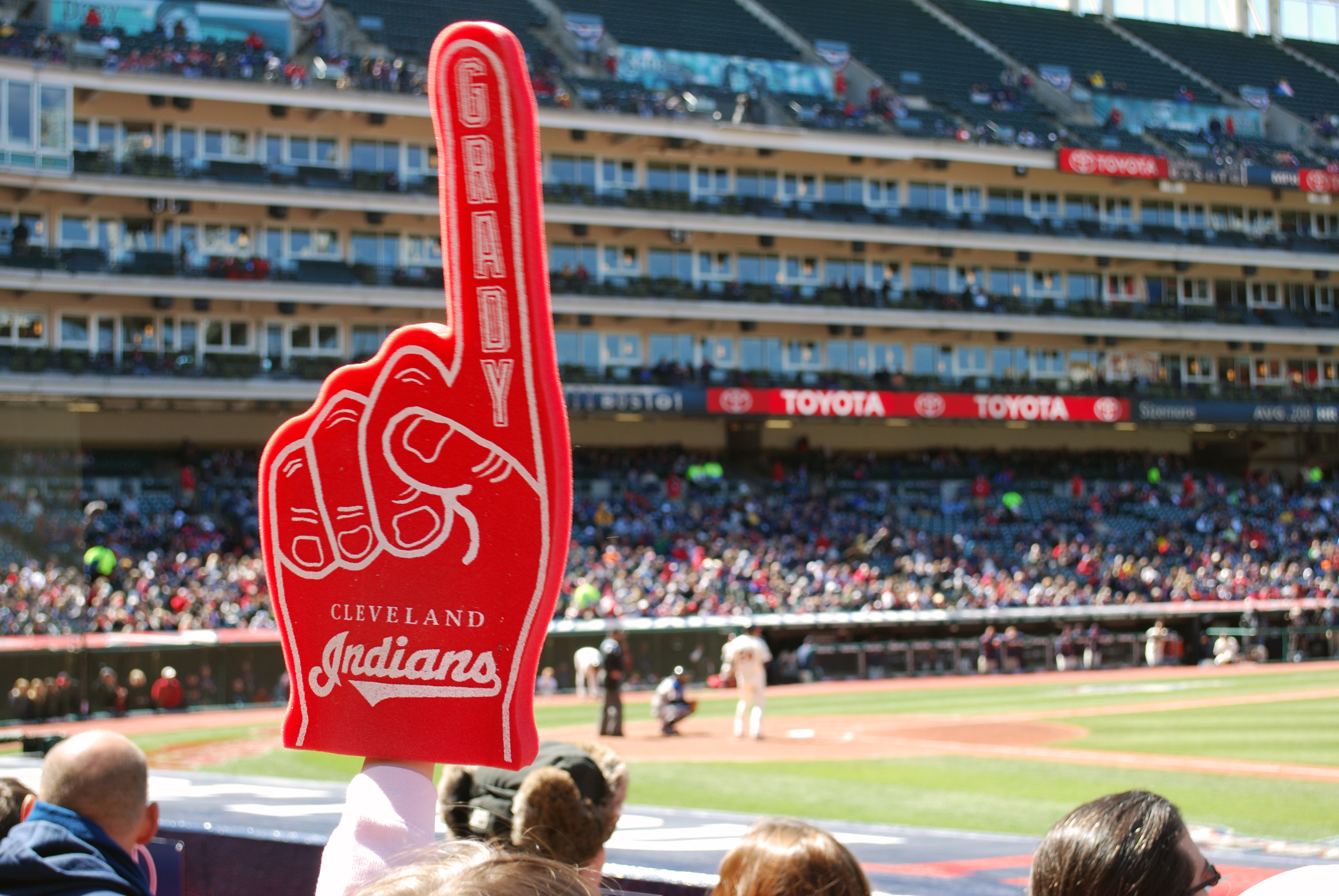
A fan raises a foam hand at a Cleveland Indians game.

A foam hand, commonly known as a foam finger, is a sports paraphernalia item worn on the hand to show support for a particular team. The most common version resembles an oversized hand with an extended index finger, and slits in their bases allow them to be worn over the hands. Usually, the surface displays a silk-screened team name, logo, or other graphic or slogan, such as "We Are #1." Foam hands are made of open-celled foam.

== History ==
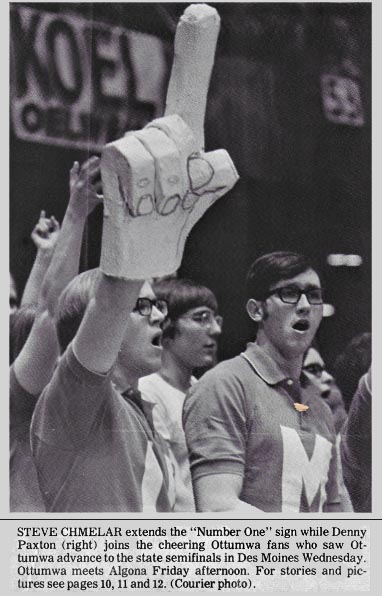

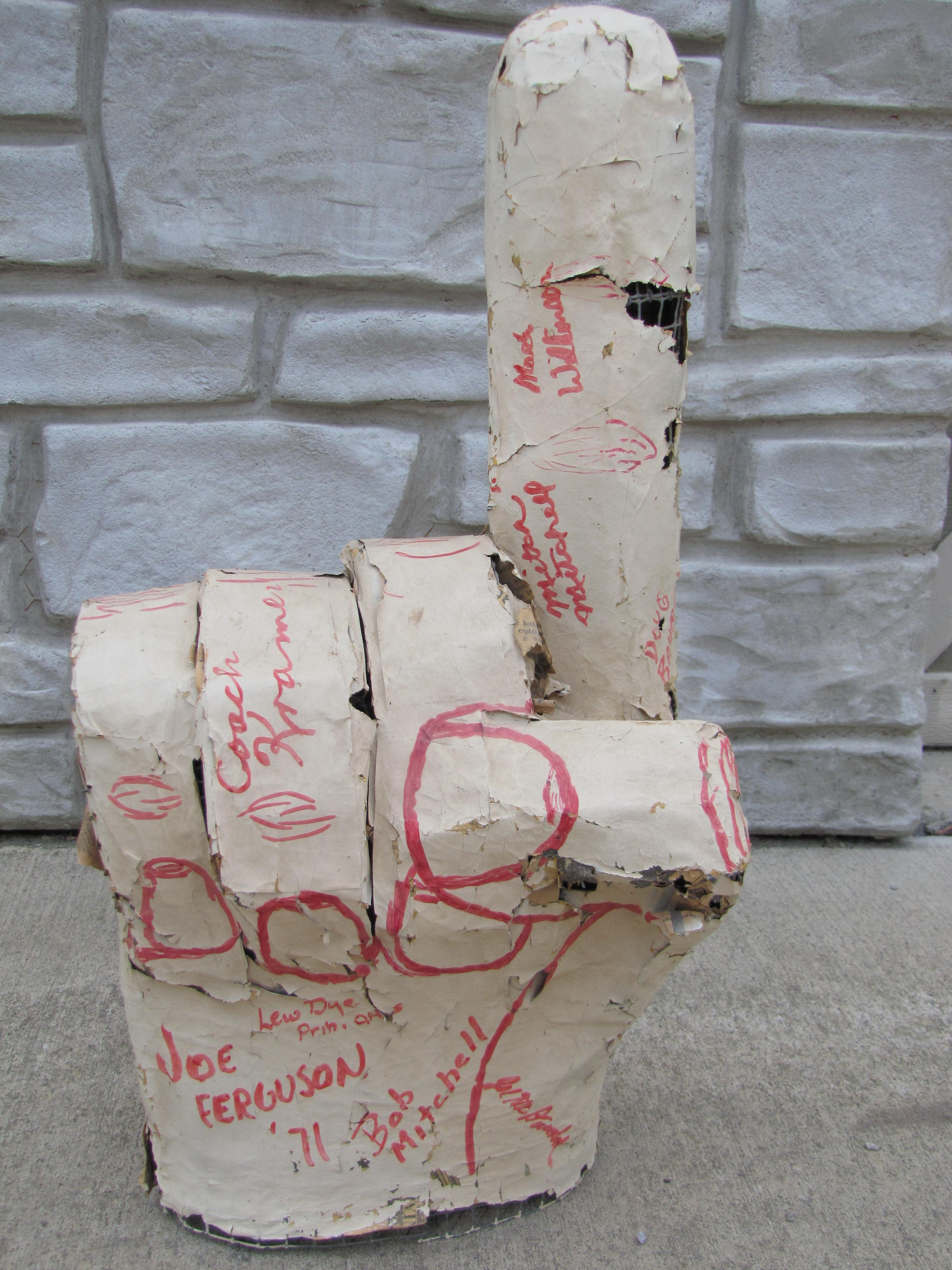
Recent (2012) photo of the 1971 item, signed by members of the Ottumwa High School Class of 1971.

The prototype foam finger was created in 1971 by Ottumwa High School student Steve Chmelar, who constructed a giant hand out of hardware cloth and papier-mâché for the 1971 Iowa High School Athletic Association Boy's State Basketball Quarter Finals, between the Ottumwa Bulldogs and the Cedar Rapids Kennedy High School Cougars. A senior in high school, Steve's photo was taken by (and published in) the local newspaper, The Ottumwa Courier, on March 18, 1971. His photo was also in the 1971 Ottumwa High School class yearbook, the Argus, in Ottumwa, Iowa.

In 1976, Geral Fauss, a teacher at Cy-Fair High School in Cypress, Texas, created foam fingers to show support for the team at the high school where he taught, to raise funds for the industrial arts club, and as a project that his industrial arts class could produce themselves. His first prototype foam finger was made out of plywood and had a painting of a "number one" done in the school's colors.

Fauss first sold his foam fingers at the 1978 Cotton Bowl in Dallas (University of Texas vs. Notre Dame), and he later went on to found Spirit Industries for the large scale manufacturing of foam fingers. In 1979, the first polyurethane foam version of the product was produced by Spirit Industries.

Geral Fauss was class of 69' and 72' at Sam Houston State University.

== Common shape variations ==
- Instead of a human hand, the foam finger is in the shape of a talon, hoof, paw, or other hand-analog to resemble that of the team mascot.
- The index finger, thumb, and pinky are extended in the American Sign Language sign for love. Often this version is captioned, "Gotta Love Those [team name]."
- The index finger and pinky are extended to represent gestures such as University of South Florida's "Go Bulls" or University of Texas' "Hook 'em Horns."
- The middle finger is extended in the obscene hand gesture the finger.

Besides being sold at all manner of sporting events and venues as souvenirs, foam fingers are used as fund-raisers for schools and booster clubs as well as corporate promotions.

To date, the majority of "foam hands" have been produced in a planar-like form. However, in early 2009, a product that more closely replicates the dimensional form of a human hand (like Hulk Hands with an extended finger) was introduced and marketed under the trade name Radhand until 2010 when it was renamed UltimateHand, produced by a new company called BrettHand.

== See also ==
- Foam tomahawk
