= Chevrolet Cheyenne (concept car) =

Concept car by Chevrolet

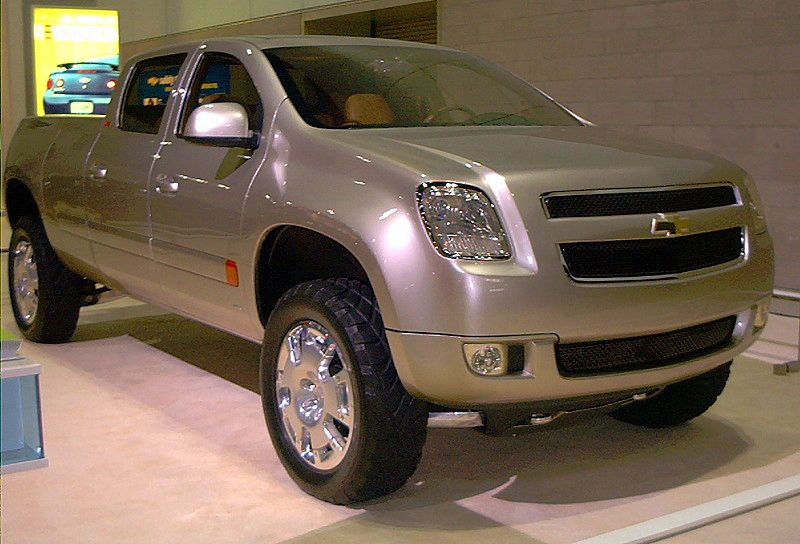

Overview
- Manufacturer: Chevrolet
- Production: 2003 (Concept car)

Body and chassis
- Class: Pickup truck
- Layout: FR layout

Powertrain
- Engine: 6.0 L V8 engine

The Chevrolet Cheyenne was a concept pickup truck developed by Chevrolet. It was first introduced at the 2003 North American International Auto Show. The Cheyenne had innovative designs not available in production vehicles at the time, such as its side access doors and unique cargo bed. The original Chevrolet Cheyenne truck originated back in 1971 with a production end date of 1998. In 1999 the Silverado was introduced. In 2006, it was spotted in a GM parking lot.

== Name ==
American Motors Corporation (AMC) used the name for its Rambler Cheyenne concept station wagon that was exhibited at the 1964 Chicago Auto Show.

The prototype is named after the Cheyenne trim badging used on Chevrolet C/K pickups prior to 1998. In Mexico, the Chevrolet Cheyenne is also a luxury trim for the Chevrolet Silverado, available in Regular Cab since the 1980s, Extended Cab since 1998, and Crew Cab since the 2005 model year.

It is not related to Chevrolet's 2013 concept pickup truck.

== Innovations ==
The Cheyenne's cargo area featured storage drawers, similar to the Honda Ridgeline's, but the Cheyenne also had side access doors to load and unload cargo from either side of the vehicle.

Entry and exit was assisted by a drop-down access step and the interior featured leather headliner with a two-piece glass panel sunroof.

The Cheyenne's engine was a supercharged 6.0 L V8 engine developing approximately 500 hp (370 kW) and 580 lb⋅ft (786 N⋅m) of torque. The vehicle featured an independent rear suspension that with Quadrasteer four-wheel steering system.
