= Chief Noc-A-Homa =

Baseball team mascot

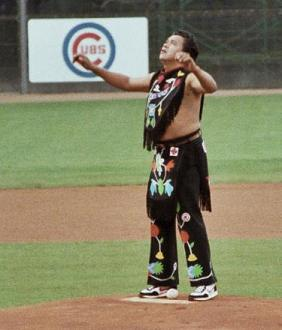
- The Chief taking the mound.
- Team: Atlanta Braves
- Description: Native American
- First seen: 1966; 60 years ago

Chief Noc-A-Homa was a mascot for the American professional baseball team Atlanta Braves from 1966 to 1985. He was primarily played by Levi Walker, Jr. After being a mascot for the franchise for two decades, the Atlanta Braves retired Chief Noc-A-Homa before the 1986 season.

== History ==
=== Origin ===
Chief Noc-A-Homa on his tipi in the 1980s

The mascot's tradition started in 1964 while the franchise was in Milwaukee. The first recorded instance of the concept came when a 16-year-old high school student named Tim Rynders set up a tipi in the centerfield bleachers. He danced and ignited smoke bombs when the Braves scored. While the concept started in Milwaukee, there was no name associated with the mascot until the team moved to Atlanta.

During the 1966 season, the Atlanta Braves held a contest to name their mascot. Mary Truesdale, a Greenville, SC resident was one of three people who entered "Chief Noc-A-Homa" the winning name chosen and announced by the Braves on July 26, 1966.

The first Chief Noc-A-Homa was portrayed by a Georgia State college student named Larry Hunn. During the 1968 season, after training from Hunn, Tim Minors took over as Noc-A-Homa.

In 1968, Levi Walker approached the Braves about having a real Native American portray the chief. Having grown weary of life as an insurance salesman, warehouse worker and plumber, Walker was hired for the 1969 season.

On May 26, 1969 Walker set his tipi on fire after lighting a smoke bomb celebrating a home run by Clete Boyer. After dancing around the tipi behind the left field fence, Chief Noc-A-Homa went inside but came charging out when flames shot out two feet into the air. The fire was quickly put out and after the game Walker said the smoke bombs were sabotaged. Walker became synonymous with Noc-A-Homa and he kept the job for 17 years, serving as the mascot until it was retired before the 1986 season. Walker, a Michigan native and member of the Odawa tribe, was the most famous version of Noc-A-Homa.

Chief Noc-A-Homa could be found at every home game in a tipi beyond the left field seats. There were times when the tipi was taken down to add more seats. Superstitious fans sometimes blamed losing streaks on the missing tipi. In 1982, when the Braves opened the season with 13 wins, owner Ted Turner removed the tipi to sell more seats. The Braves lost 19 of their next 21 games and fell to second place. Turner told team management to put the tipi back up and the Braves went on to win the National League West.

=== Princess Win-A-Lotta ===
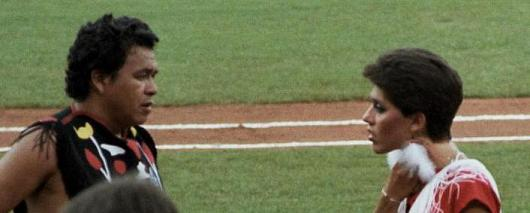
The Chief and the Princess conferring before a 1983 game.

In 1983, Chief Noc-A-Homa was joined by "Princess Win-A-Lotta" who was portrayed by Kim Calos. After Calos suffered a serious back injury in a car accident that cut her season short, the Braves chose not to bring Princess Win-A-Lotta back in 1984.

=== Retirement and later life ===
In 1986, Walker and the Braves mutually agreed to end their relationship due to disagreements about pay and missed dates. Walker made $60 (equivalent to $176 in 2025) per game and received $4,860 (equivalent to $14275 in 2025) for 80 appearances. Walker died on November 24, 2023, at 81 years old.

== Comments by Russell Means ==
In 1972, Native American activist Russell Means filed a $9 million lawsuit against the Cleveland Indians for their use of "Chief Wahoo." Means also objected to the Braves use of Chief Noc-A-Homa. Means said, "What if it was the Atlanta Germans and after every home run a German dressed in military uniform began hitting a Jew on the head with a baseball bat?" For a week, controversy raged. Walker went on radio talk shows to defend Noc-A-Homa, saying, among other things, "I think Indians can be proud that their names are used with professional sports teams.” Ultimately Noc-A-Homa survived the controversy.

== See also ==
- Atlanta Braves tomahawk chop and name controversy
- Native American mascot controversy
- List of sports team names and mascots derived from Indigenous peoples
