= Tomahawk chop =

American sports gesture

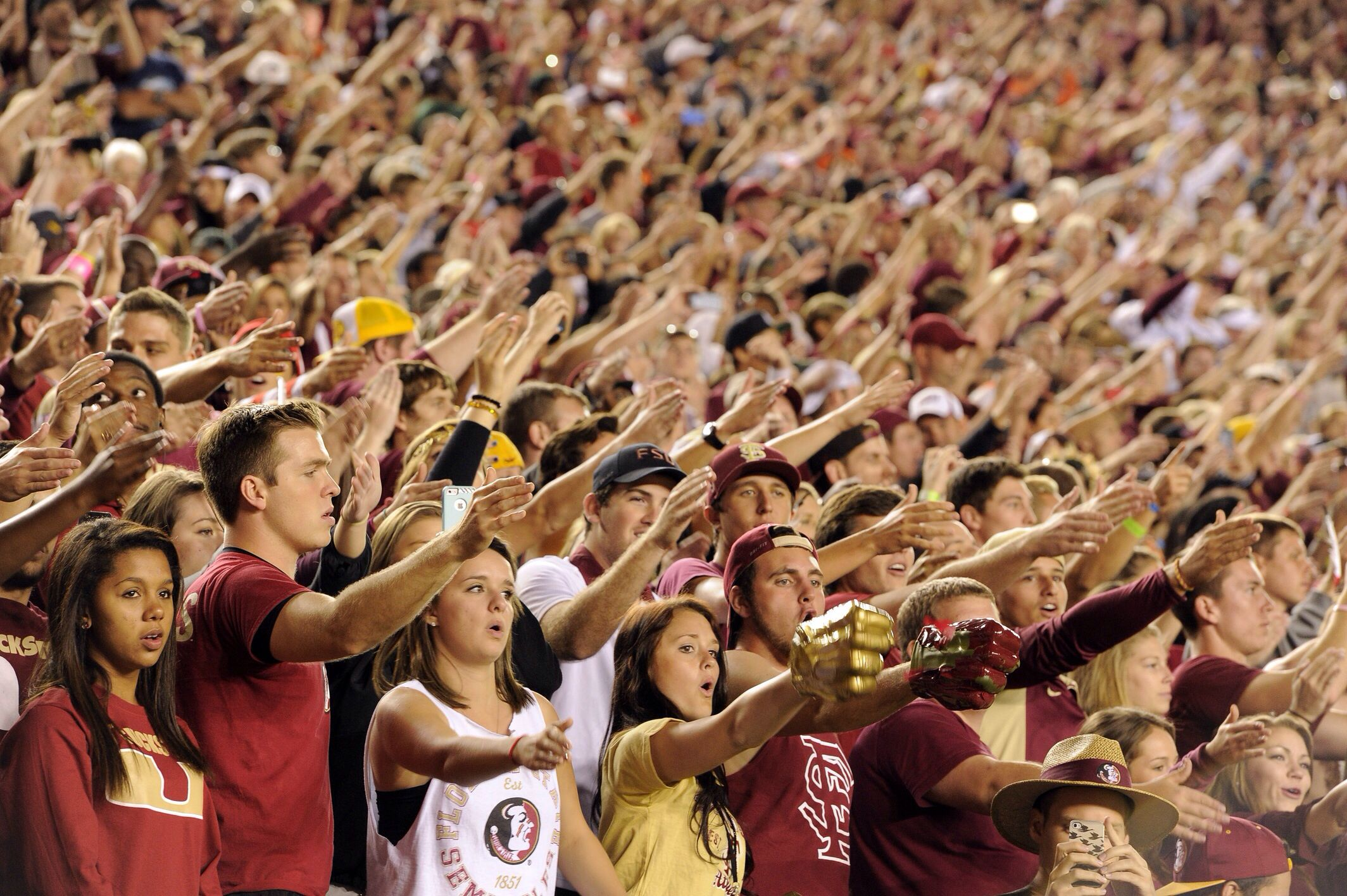
Florida State Seminoles fans performing the tomahawk chop

The tomahawk chop (also known as the "war chant") is a sports gesture popularly used by fans of the American Florida State Seminoles, Atlanta Braves baseball team, the Kansas City Chiefs American football team, and the English Exeter Chiefs rugby union team. The tomahawk chop involves moving the forearm forwards and backwards repeatedly with an open palm to simulate a tomahawk chopping, and is often accompanied by a distinctive cheer. The Atlanta Braves also developed a foam tomahawk to complement the fan actions.

The gesture was first observed in the 1984 Florida State Seminoles football season, and has since been adopted by numerous other sports teams at the academic and professional levels internationally.

The chop has been the source of controversy for decades and has been characterized as a racist caricature of Native American culture. The "chop" has also been performed at the high school level, where hundreds of teams continue to use Native American names and imagery, which has been a factor in the ongoing movement to change these practices.

== Florida State University ==
The tomahawk chop first appeared as a random occurrence during the 1984 matchup between the Florida State Seminoles and the Auburn Tigers. The chant first originated in the fraternity section of Doak Campbell Stadium, and was echoed by Florida State's Marching Chiefs marching band. The action was adopted by fans of the FSU Seminoles over the following years.

== Kansas City Chiefs ==
The Kansas City Chiefs' fans doing the tomahawk chop

Following its adoption by the Florida State Seminoles, the Kansas City Chiefs adopted the gesture in November 1990, when the Northwest Missouri State band, directed by 1969 Florida State graduate Al Sergel, did the chant.

"It is a direct descendant of Florida State," said Chiefs promotions director Phil Thomas. "The band started doing the tomahawk chop, and the players and Marty Schottenheimer loved it."

The tomahawk chop has evolved into a pregame tradition at home games. Chiefs cheerleaders had long used their hands to bang on a large drum to the beat of the tomahawk chop, sometimes replaced by a former player or local celebrity using a large drum stick, all while the crowd performs the chop action. Since 2020, however, Kansas City Chiefs cheerleaders have been required to lead the chop with a closed fist rather than the traditional open palm.

Before the 2024 Super Bowl, the Kansas City Chiefs were criticized by Native American advocacy groups for their use of the chop. Rhonda LeValdo of the group Not in Our Honor described the tomahawk chop as synchronized racism. The Kansas City Indian Center, the Not in Our Coalition, End Racism KC, and the National Congress of American Indians have called on the team to change their name and end the tomahawk chop.

== Atlanta Braves ==
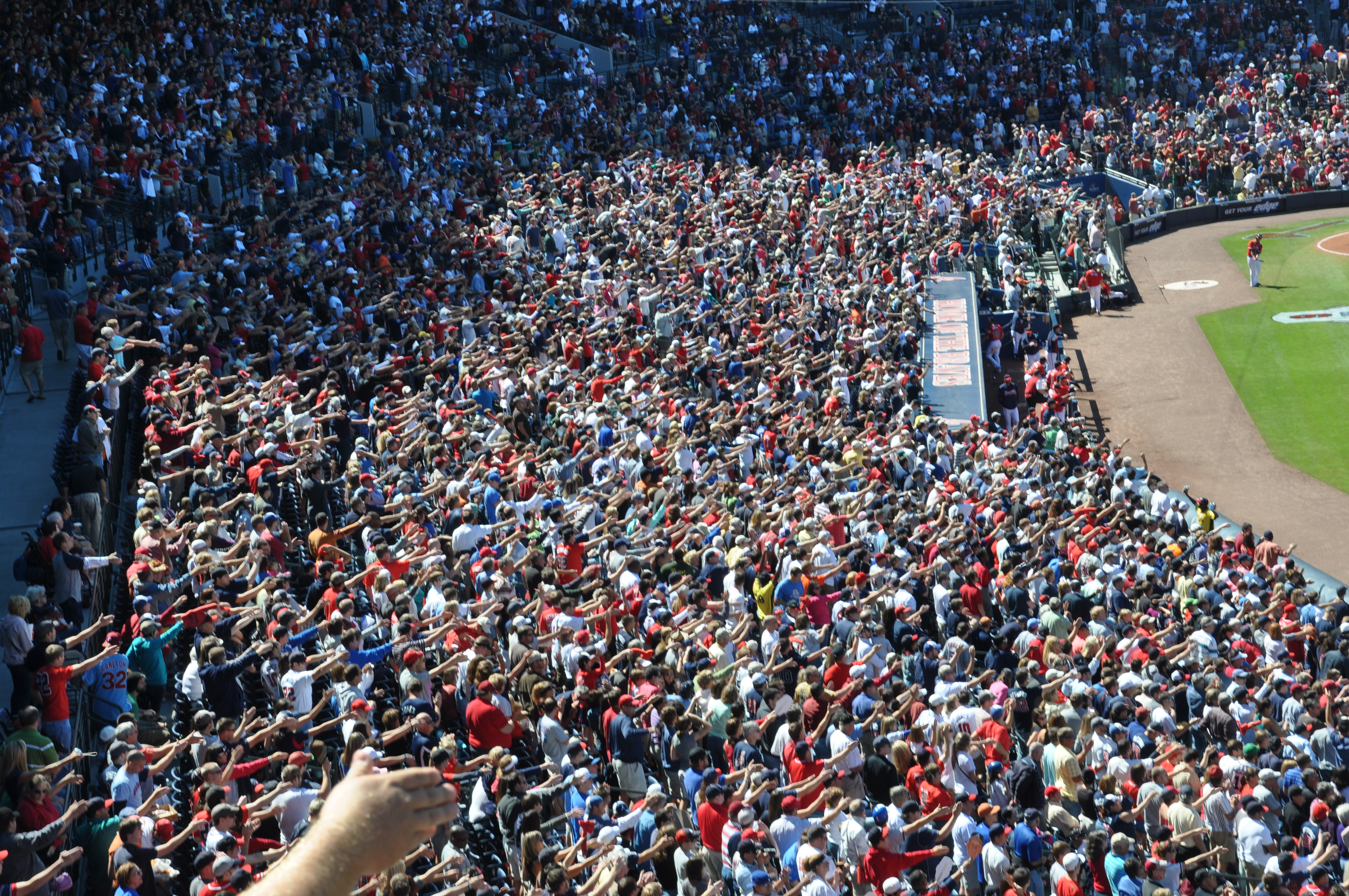
Atlanta Braves fans doing the tomahawk chop

The tomahawk chop was adopted by fans of the Atlanta Braves in 1991. While some have credited Deion Sanders for bringing the chop to Atlanta, it was Braves organist Carolyn King who started playing the "tomahawk song." King started playing the "tomahawk song" before at bats for a few seasons, but it caught on with Braves fans when the team started winning in 1991.

The usage of foam tomahawks led to criticism from Native American groups that it was "demeaning" to them and called for them to be banned. In response, the Braves' public relations director said that it was "a proud expression of unification and family". King, who did not understand the political ramifications, approached one of the Native American chiefs who were protesting. The chief told her that leaving her job as an organist would not change anything and that if she left "they'll find someone else to play."

In 2016, when the Atlanta Braves played their last game at Turner Field before leaving for SunTrust Park, the last official act done at Turner Field was known as "The Final Chop", where the Atlanta Braves warchant was played one last time with fans doing the tomahawk chop.

=== Foam tomahawk ===
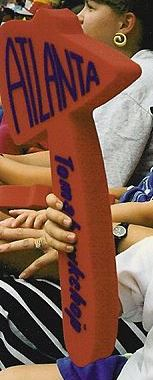
A foam tomahawk

A foam tomahawk is a foam rubber sports paraphernalia item (like a foam №. 1 finger) in the shape of a tomahawk, often used to accompany the tomahawk chop. They were first created in 1991 for the Atlanta Braves baseball team following their adoption of the tomahawk chop.

==== Creation ====
Foam tomahawks were invented by foam salesman Paul Braddy. Upon hearing Skip Caray saying during a radio broadcast of an Atlanta Braves game that they needed tomahawks to accompany their newly acquired tomahawk chop celebration, he approached the Braves' concessions manager John Eifert with a suggestion of a foam rubber tomahawk. Eifert agreed providing they cost around $5, to which Braddy carved a tomahawk out of foam with an electric knife. Eifert bought 5,000 for sale for the Atlanta Braves. The foam tomahawks became very popular with Braves fans at the Atlanta–Fulton County Stadium, so much so that Braddy was able to quit his $60,000-a-year job as a salesman in order to manufacture foam tomahawks full-time, making 8,000 a day.

Braddy started selling the foam tomahawks himself. However, he was approached by Major League Baseball a month into the venture, who claimed that the foam tomahawk infringed upon the Atlanta Braves' copyrighted tomahawk logo. In response, Braddy made a deal with Major League Baseball Properties to license the MLB symbol and receive logistical support in exchange for 10% of the profits.

== Exeter Chiefs ==
The English rugby team Exeter Chiefs adopted the name of "Chiefs" in 1999. In 2010 they started using the Tomahawk chop along with the war chant, following their promotion to the Premiership Rugby. They use it as their walk out music at Sandy Park as well as a chant by their traveling fans during rugby matches elsewhere in the UK. In June 2020 a petition was launched by a group of Exeter Chiefs supporters calling for an end to the club's use of Native American imagery, including the Tomahawk chop. In August 2020, it was reported that BT Sport would not be including the "tomahawk chop chant" in its simulated crowd noises, during behind-closed-doors games played by the Exeter Chiefs and broadcast on the BT Sport platform.

In 2022 Exeter Chiefs rebranded with a Celtic Iron Age Dumnonii Tribe club crest, dropping the controversial Native American crest. They also announced they would no longer play the Tomahawk Chop as their run out anthem from the 2022–23 season. However, in January 2023 the chant was sung by supporters and, according to reports on social media, played over stadium speakers.

== Controversy ==
The chop has been characterized by some, including Native American tribes, as mocking Native American culture. It is criticized for being a reference to the former practice of scalping. Shortly after the Atlanta Braves adopted it, there were several calls from Native Americans for Braves fans to stop doing the tomahawk chop. Before the 1991 World Series several Native Americans protested against the Braves using the tomahawk chop outside the Metrodome. During the protests Clyde Bellecourt, national director of the American Indian Movement, suggested that the team could be called "the Atlanta Negroes, Atlanta Klansmen or Atlanta Nazis". In 2009, the Gill-Montague Regional School Committee, a local school board in Massachusetts, banned the use of the gesture at school sporting events, calling it offensive and discriminatory. In 2016, Native American groups asked the Kansas City Chiefs to stop doing the tomahawk chop. In the same year a similar request was made of Exeter Chiefs. The editorial board of The Kansas City Star newspaper called for the cessation of the so-called "Arrowhead Chop" in late 2019, noting opposition from Native Americans and Tribes, and stating that the practice stereotypes and dehumanizes Native Americans.

In politics, during the 2012 Senate election in Massachusetts, staffers of candidate Scott Brown were filmed doing the tomahawk chop at a campaign rally towards supporters of Elizabeth Warren, to mock Warren's claim of having Native American ancestry.

The controversy has persisted since and became national news again during the 2019 National League Division Series. During the series, St. Louis Cardinals relief pitcher and Cherokee Nation member Ryan Helsley was asked about the chop and chant. Helsley said he found the fans' chanting and arm motions insulting and that the chop depicts natives “in this kind of caveman-type people way who aren’t intellectual.” Helsley's comments prompted the Braves to stop handing out foam tomahawks, playing the chop music, or showing the chop graphic when the series returned to Atlanta for Game 5. The Braves released a statement saying they would "continue to evaluate how we activate elements of our brand, as well as the overall in-game experience" and that they would continue a "dialogue with those in the Native American community after the postseason concludes."

During the off-season, the Braves met with the National Congress of American Indians to discuss a path forward. In July 2020, the team faced mounting pressure to change after the Cleveland Indians and Washington Redskins announced they were discussing brand changes. The Braves released a statement announcing that discussions were still ongoing about the chop, but that the team name would not be changed.

== In popular culture ==
- A 1991 episode of Saturday Night Live which was in a conflicting timeslot with the Atlanta Braves playing, had the host Christian Slater giving a monologue thanking everyone for selecting his show over the World Series. Slater then realizes he is speaking to no one, then walks around to find everyone, even the cast and crew of the show, watching the baseball game and doing the Tomahawk chop.
- Mel Brooks' 1993 film Robin Hood: Men in Tights features a medieval crowd performing the chop in support of Robin Hood during an archery contest.

== See also ==
- Arabian riff
- Tarantella Napoletana representing Italy
- Oriental riff
