= Sioux Chief Manufacturing =

Company

- Type: Private
- Industry: Plumbing appliance manufacturing
- Founded: August 1957; 69 years ago
- Headquarters: Kansas City, Missouri
- Website: www.siouxchief.com

Sioux Chief Manufacturing is a family-owned American corporation based in Kansas City, Missouri, that designs and manufactures rough plumbing products for residential, commercial, industrial and government applications. The company's product line is divided into four core groups: Supply, Drainage, Support and Specialties. From its headquarters in Kansas City, Missouri, Sioux Chief's comprehensive product line is sold through qualified wholesale and retail distributors worldwide.

== History ==
Sioux Chief Manufacturing was founded and incorporated in August 1957 by Martin E. "Ed" Ismert, Jr. The company began its operations by packaging specialty fasteners and related products intended for residential plumbing applications.

In the early 1960s, Sioux Chief began spinning closed lengths of copper tube which could be used by plumbers for stub outs. This "preformed copper tube" saved plumbers from the labor-intensive process of soldering caps onto their copper tube.

By 1975 a heavy emphasis on sales and new product development began when Ed's two eldest sons (Martin E. Ismert III, "Mike" and Joseph P. Ismert) purchased the corporation and took over operations. Since then Sioux Chief has welcomed the third generation of family members to the team and has introduced a wide range of innovative products.

Sioux Chief began operations in a 3,000-square-foot space on the third floor of a plumbing wholesaler in the West Bottoms area of Kansas City, Kansas. The company later relocated to Kansas City, Missouri, and from 1970 to 1983 operated in a 10,000-square-foot facility in Grandview, Missouri. In 1983, Sioux Chief acquired its first building—a 23,000-square-foot facility near Peculiar, Missouri—which expanded over time to more than 300,000 square feet on 140 acres. In 2017, the company moved into its current 600,000-square-foot headquarters in Kansas City, Missouri, housing manufacturing, distribution, and office operations, with space for future growth.

== Manufacturing & Innovation ==
The company designs, builds, and maintains its own machines and equipment, including tools and machines to form copper tube, plastic injection molds, packaging, and testing equipment. Controlling production helps ensure that exact product tolerances are achieved. Process innovation also controls manufacturing costs, providing constant, reliable value to its customers.

Over the years, Sioux Chief has created and manufactured a wide range of innovative plumbing products. The company holds numerous patents for plumbing products, with new products constantly under development. Product innovation is initiated by field research and interviews with plumbers, engineers, code officials and distributors.

== Name and Logo ==
Sioux Chief's founder was a student of, and greatly interested in Western American history. In learning about the indigenous tribes of the upper Midwest, he found that the Lakota, or Sioux Nation embodied the cultural ideals he wished his new company to be based on – those of Family, Humility, Plumbing, and Hard Work. In tribute, he named the company Sioux Chief. His brother, Cornelius Ismert, an artist trained under Thomas Hart Benton, created the original logo depicting a "Young Determined Sioux Chief" in ceremonial dress, which continues to appear on the company’s promotional and packaging materials.

== Awards and honors ==
In 2012, Sioux Chief was named one of Kansas City's best businesses by the Kansas City Business Journal with their Champions of Business Award.
