= Chevrolet Cheyenne =

Chevrolet Cheyenne may refer to:

- Chevrolet C/K (a trim package for this truck line)
- Chevrolet Silverado (post-C/K Silverado marketed in Mexico)
- Chevrolet Cheyenne (concept car)
