= Carolyn Rose King =

First Black stadium organist in US major league history

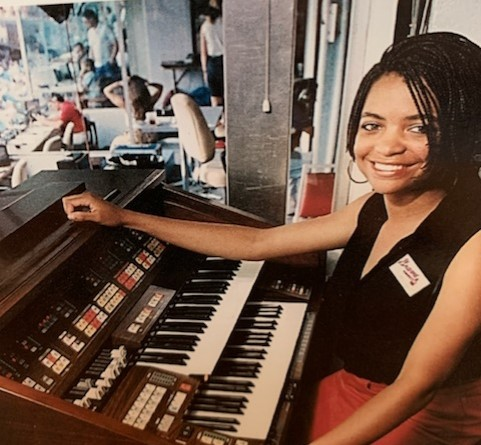
Carolyn King in 1991.

Carolyn Rose King (born 1970) is a musician known for being the stadium organist for the Atlanta Braves, the first African American stadium organist in major league history. When she started her job in 1988, she was also the youngest full-time organist in major league baseball history.

King first got the job as an eighteen-year-old high school senior at Avondale High School in DeKalb County, beating out six other applicants for the job including the incumbent organist Lowery Ballew. She played organ for the Braves at Atlanta–Fulton County Stadium and then Turner Field for seventeen years from 1988 through 2005 when she retired to spend more time with her family. After she left, the control room at Turner Field was gutted and the organ was removed and was not replaced until 2009, when Matthew Kaminski took over. King introduced local fans to "The Tomahawk Chop," hitting the D and G keys in rapid succession, sometimes to stop fans from doing The Wave during significant plays on the field.

King played organ at her local church as a young adult as well as played in her high school band. She attended Clark Atlanta University and graduated with a degree in music. She has an earned Doctorate from The University of Sarasota in Music Education. Her day job is as a music teacher in the DeKalb County Public School System.
