= Warpaint (mascot) =

Former mascot of the Kansas City Chiefs

Warpaint was a mascot for the Kansas City Chiefs of the National Football League (NFL). Three individual pinto horses have been used for Warpaint. It is associated with the team's glory days at Municipal Stadium, having won two American Football League (AFL) championships. Warpaint led the team's victory parade after winning Super Bowl IV. After the original Warpaint's retirement in 1989, the team used K. C. Wolf as its lone mascot from 1989 to 2009. In the celebration of the AFL's 50th anniversary, the Chiefs resumed the tradition of Warpaint for the 2009 season, introducing the new horse at the home-opener against the Oakland Raiders. Warpaint was retired again in 2021 amid the nationwide Native American mascot controversy and the team's new policy to eliminate some Native American imagery.

== History ==
Originally, the horse was ridden bareback by Bob Johnson, who wore a headdress as a pastiche of ceremonial American Indian regalia. Warpaint circled the field at the beginning of each game and after each touchdown. In a 1975 game against the Oakland Raiders, the Chiefs won 42–10, prompting Warpaint to circle the field for each of the team's six touchdowns. Raiders head coach John Madden, following the loss, quipped that "We couldn't beat the Chiefs, but we damn near killed their horse". After Bob Johnson retired, he was replaced in the 1978–79 season by Pete Runyan and Cheryl McDaniel, both local experienced riders who in a symbol of gender equality took turns riding Warpaint after passing a bareback riding audition.

The first Warpaint was foaled in 1955, and the second in 1968. The second Warpaint died in 2005 at the age of 37 at Benjamin Stables in Kansas City where it is now buried. The horse made an appearance at a 1997 Chiefs game where it received a standing ovation from a sold-out crowd.

On September 20, 2009, a new Warpaint was unveiled at Arrowhead Stadium at the home opener against the Oakland Raiders. The horse was ridden by Susie, a Chiefs cheerleader, in contrast to the original headdress-clad rider. Due to a positive response from fans, Warpaint and Susie appeared at all home games, including at pregame events. Warpaint appeared at the Chiefs Training Camp for days with special events for fans.

On July 26, 2021, the team eliminated some Native American imagery amid the nationwide Native American mascot controversy, and the Chiefs announced Warpaint's retirement again.

== See also ==
- The Scout (Kansas City, Missouri statue)
- List of historical horses
