= K. C. Wolf =

Mascot for the NFL's Kansas City Chiefs

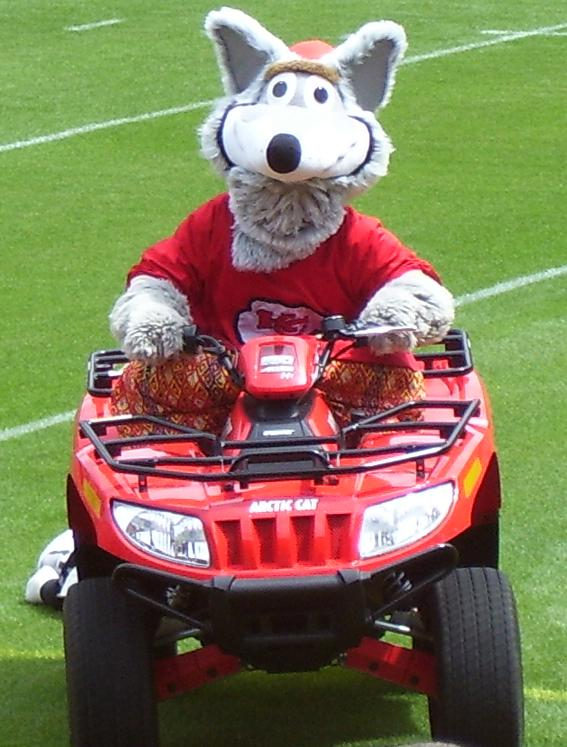
K. C. Wolf has been the Kansas City Chiefs' mascot since 1989

K. C. Wolf is the official mascot of the National Football League’s Kansas City Chiefs. He was first introduced in 1989 as a successor to Warpaint, a horse ridden by a man wearing a full Indian chief headdress, from the mid-1960s. K. C. Wolf was named after the team’s "Wolfpack", a group of boisterous fans who sat in temporary bleachers at Municipal Stadium.

In addition to football-related mascot duties, K. C. Wolf also appears at major and minor league baseball games, community activities, conventions, grand openings, parades, and other events. In the inaugural class of 2006, he was inducted into the Mascot Hall of Fame.

K. C. Wolf was first portrayed by Dana S. Hubbard in 1989, but has since been portrayed by Dan Meers, who previously portrayed Truman the Tiger of the University of Missouri from 1986 to 1990 and Fredbird of the St. Louis Cardinals major league baseball team. Meers acts as a motivational speaker at special events, most of which are in and around the Kansas City area.

During the 2001 Pro Bowl, Meers tackled a drunk fan who had wandered onto the field and kept him restrained until security arrived.

On September 23, 2007, Meers aided security guards in taking down a fan who had come on the field. He followed with a display of bodybuilding poses.

On November 23, 2013, Meers suffered spinal injuries while practicing a stunt on the zip line (which broke his back); he also broke seven ribs and his tailbone, and he also collapsed one of his lungs. Meers later used this as one of his subjects in some of his motivational speeches and wrote about it in his books Wolves Can’t Fly and Mascot on a Mission.

On June 17, 2025, Meers announced his retirement from portraying K. C. Wolf.
