= Borchers =

Borchers is a surname. Notable people with the surname include:

- Adolf Borchers (1913–1996), German fighter ace
- A. Webber Borchers (1906–1989), American politician and businessman
- Bobby Borchers (born 1952), American singer
- Charles M. Borchers (1869–1946), American politician
- Cornell Borchers (1925–2014), German actress
- George Borchers (1869–1938), American baseball pitcher
- Hans-Jürgen Borchers (1926–2011), German mathematical physicist
- Karen T. Borchers (born 1957), American photojournalist
- Nat Borchers (born 1981), American soccer player
- Ronny Borchers (1957–2024), German footballer
- Walter Borchers (1916–1945), German flying ace

== See also ==
- Bill Borcher (1919–2003), American basketball coach
- Borchers algebra
