= Dan Dinneen =

American politician

- Official portrait, 1935

Member of the Illinois House of Representatives from the 28th district
- In office January 1935 – December 6, 1948
- Preceded by: William C. Chynoweth

Mayor of Decatur, Illinois
- In office 1911–1919
- Preceded by: Charles M. Borchers
- Succeeded by: Charles M. Borchers

Personal details
- Born: October 6, 1870 Decatur, Illinois, U.S
- Died: December 6, 1948 (aged 78) Decatur, Illinois, U.S.
- Party: Republican
- Profession: grocer, mediator, railroad laborer

Dan Dinneen (October 6, 1870–December 6, 1948) was an American politician who served as mayor of Decatur, Illinois, (1911–1919) and a member the Illinois House of Representatives (1935–1948).

== Early life ==
Dinneen was born in Decatur, Illinois on October 6, 1879, the son of John and Rose Dinneen. He attended the Decatur parochial schools and Decatur High School. Dinneen's father held office as the county coroner and as a city alderman (city councilor).

At the age of fifteen, Dinneen took a job firing engines on the Wabash Railroad. In 1894, his father opened a grocery store in Decatur and Dinneen began working there. After his father died in 1896, Dinneen took ownership of the store. In 1904, Dinneen was selected as president of the Decatur Grocer's Association. After being elected mayor in 1911, he sold the grocery business.

== Mayoralty (1911–1919) ==
Portrait of Dinneen, circa 1911

A Republican, Dinneen served as mayor of Decatur from 1911 to 1919.

=== Mayoral campaigns ===
==== 1911 ====
Portrait of Dinneen, circa 1911

Dinneen won election in 1911, challenging incumbent mayor Charles M. Borchers The other contenders in the nonpartisan primary were manufacturer W. C. Field, as well as fellow grocers George A. Stadler and W. O. Kiser.

The 1911 city primary was on March 14 and the general election was on April 18. The 1911 mayoral election was anticipated to possibly feature a large field for mayor, but Dinneen was regarded as the formidable front-runner. Field and Borchers were seen as other leading contenders to advance from the primary to the general election. Dinneen was regarded as having safe odds of advancing to the general election. Borchers was seen as perhaps his most likely opponent. However, Field was also making a heavy play for the mayoralty. Stadler, was regarded by some reports to have failed to make much headway in the election; while other reports considered him, Field, and Borchers all being competitive enough to stand a chance at advancing with Dinneen to the general election.

A major debate of the campaign was alcohol prohibition, with temperance advocates accusing Dinneen of being "too liberal on that issue" (too friendly towards alcohol consumption).

In the general election, Dinneen defeated Borchers by a 81-vote margin in the general election. The 1911 election was the first to be held after the city transitioned from an aldermanic government to a city commission government.

==== 1915 ====
Dinneen won re-election in 1915, running on the "Good Government" ticket and defeating challenger John D. Barnhart Sr. by a margin of merely 67 of the 16,047 votes cast. The election was held during partial women's suffrage in Illinois during which women could vote in local elections. Dinneen led among male voters, while Barnhart led among female voters.

==== 1919 ====
In 1919, Dinneen sought re-election to a third term. He was challenged by former mayor Borchers as well as by Lee Boland and George N. Egnor. Dinneen lost the general election Borchers by a 346 margin in an election with a large turnout.

==== 1923 ====
Portrait, circa 1923

Dineen ran for mayor again in 1923. The 1923 primary featured a record turnout. Dineen ultimately lost the general election.

Dinneen later declined to run for mayor again in the 1931 mayoral election.

=== Mayoral tenure ===
The first mayor to hold office under the city commission form of government in Decatur, Dinneen dealt with the task of brokering peace between department heads who were combatting with each other for purview over overlapping conflicting subject matter. Dinneen took the position that no department head should be given full absolute making powers over policy decisions.

In 1918, when the Spanish flu pandemic impacted Decatur, Dinneen served as an orderly at a temporary hospital that was erected at the Millikin Home.

== Labor mediator (1921–1929) ==
In 1920, Dinneen headed the Macon County organization of Len Small's gubernatorial campaign.

Dinneen worked for the Illinois State Employment Office and as a mediator for state labor disputes from 1921 to 1929. In this role, he dealt with disputes in the Decatur area. After Louis Lincoln Emmerson became governor, he removed Dinneen and replaced him with Mike Costello, without offering explanation for this personnel change.

== State representative (1935–1948) ==
Portrait as state representative, 1939

Dinneen served in the Illinois House of Representatives from 1935 until his death in 1948.

=== Legislative campaigns ===
In 1932, unsuccessfully ran for state rep, becoming a Republican nominee but losing the general election. He was successfully elected two years later.

In his elections, his support came largely from the portions of his district in Macon County, with the rest of the district generally supporting his opponents. However, his vote share in Macon County (including Decatur) was always enough to secure him election to his seat. Since Dinneen usually backed pro-labor positions as a legislator, he received solid backing from laborers in Macon County that was critical in many of his re-elections. Dinneen could not always rely on the local Republican organization to support his re-election efforts, and instead had to rely on his own personal network and popularity.

Dinneen's support for old age pensions led the Townsend Club endorse his re-election in 1936. Dinneen's 97 vote margin of re-election in 1936 was narrow enough that defeated candidate William Querfeld challenged the result before the state legislature to seek a partial recount.

=== Legislative tenure ===
Dinneen as state representative, 1943

Dinneen was credited with championing a number of pieces of pro-labor legislation. He was one of the early advocates for implementing a permanent registration of voters as a method to increase voter participation in Illinois. While Dinneen preferred not to buck his party, he often displayed an independent streak as a legislator and gained a reputation of often bucking his party caucus on pieces of legislation he found to be of either personal concern or of great concern to residents of his district. Two examples of this included standing against making a sales tax the main method of state revenue and supporting expanded old-aid pension funding early into the New Deal era. Dinneen was also known to get along with members of the Democratic Party in the legislature.

In 1935, Dinneen declined to accept a role heading a regional Republican Party effort to have voters sign pledge cards for voters committing to vote against Democratic resident Franklin D. Roosevelt in the 1936 presidential election. While Dinneen opposed reelection of the president, he declined this role on the grounds that viewed this tactic as a hate campaign towards Roosevelt that he had no desire of heading.

Dinneen as state representative, 1945

On July 14, 1947, Dinneen announced that his current term in the state legislature would be his last; and that he planned to retire from politics upon its conclusion.

== Personal life ==
In 1897, Dinneen married to Helen Josephine Hackett. He was widowed after her 1945 death.

Dinneen was a lifelong member of the Catholic Church, belonging to the Saint Patrick's Catholic Church congregation his entire life.

Dinneen was a member of Elks and Knights of Columbus.

For many years had the low license plate number of 24. Low numbers were considered a prestigious thing to have. He traded the plate with a Chicago Democratic state legislator's as a gesture of goodwill between them, being exchanged the Democrats' previous plate number of 298.

Dinneen's health failed in his last year of life. Dinneen died on December 6, 1948, at St. Mary's Hospital in Decatur, Illinois. He bequeathed most of his estate (valued at $23,000) to religious and charitable organizations.

== Electoral history ==
=== Mayoral ===
1911 Decatur mayoral primary
Candidate	Votes	%
Dan Dinneen	2,443	38.03
Charles M. Borchers (incumbent)	1,940	30.20
G. A. Stadler	1,131	17.61
W. C. Field	898	13.98
W. O. Kiser	12	0.19
Total votes	6,424	

1911 Decatur mayoral election
Candidate	Votes	%
Dan Dinneen		
Charles M. Borchers (incumbent)		
Total votes		

1915 Decatur mayoral election
Candidate	Votes	%
Dan Dinneen (incumbent)	8,059	50.20
J. D. Barnhart	7,988	49.80
Total votes	16,047	100

1919 Decatur mayoral primary
Candidate	Votes	%
Dan Dinneen (incumbent)	3,527	37.92
Charles M. Borchers	3,203	34.44
Lee Boland	2,479	26.66
George N. Egnor	91	0.98
Total votes	9,300	100

1919 Decatur mayoral election (initial returns published in news)
Candidate	Votes	%
Charles M. Borchers	7,734	51.33
Dan Dinneen (incumbent)	7,391	48.87
Total votes	15,125	100

1923 Decatur mayoral primary
Candidate	Votes	%
Dan Dinneen	6,751	
Elmer R. Elder	5,197	
John F. Mattes	3,178	
Thomas Hays	212	
Total votes		

1923 Decatur mayoral election
Candidate	Votes	%
Elmer R. Elder		
Dan Dinneen		
Total votes		

=== Legislative ===
1934 Illinois House of Representatives 28th district Republican primary
Party	Candidate	Votes	%
Republican	William C. Chynoweth (incumbent)	21,744.0	41.24
Republican	Dan Dinneen	13,571.5	25.74
Republican	Webber Borchers	4,529.5	8.59
Republican	Thomas C. Buxton	4,509.0	8.55
Republican	Wayne L. Sprague	4,502.5	8.54
Republican	William Keck McDavid	3,873.5	7.35

1934 Illinois House of Representatives 28th district election
Party	Candidate	Votes	%
Democratic	Nicholas L. Hubbard	42,485.0	26.94
Democratic	Verne R. Johnson	41,827.0	26.52
Republican	Dan Dinneen	38,509.0	24.41
Republican	William C. Chynoweth (incumbent)	34,909.5	22.13

1936 Illinois House of Representatives 28th district Republican primary
Party	Candidate	Votes	%
Republican	Dan Dinneen (incumbent)	21,135.0	
Republican	William Querfeld	11,562.0	
Republican	Ray A. Dillinger	11,274.0	
Republican	T.C. Buxton	5,352.5	
Republican	Joseph L. Rosenberg	4,195.0	

1936 Illinois House of Representatives 28th district election
Party	Candidate	Votes	%
Democratic	Nicholas L. Hubbard (incumbent)	57,955.5	
Democratic	Dean S. McGaughey	52,516.0	
Republican	Dan Dinneen (incumbent)	42,642.5	
Republican	William Querfeld	42,545.5	

1938 Illinois House of Representatives 28th district Republican primary
Party	Candidate	Votes	%
Republican	Dan Dinneen (incumbent)	17,662.0	
Republican	Ray A. Dillinger	15,554.0	
Republican	Richard James Oglesby	7,724.5	
Republican	Dean C. Montgomery	4,737.0	

1938 Illinois House of Representatives 28th district election
Party	Candidate	Votes	%
Republican	Dan Dinneen (incumbent)	44,331.5	
Republican	Ray A. Dillinger	44,232.0	
Democratic	Dean S. McGaughey (incumbent)	37,776.0	
Democratic	Felix E. Wilson	36,682.0	

1940 Illinois House of Representatives 28th district election
Party	Candidate	Votes	%
Democratic	Dean S. McGaughey (incumbent)	55,318.5	
Republican	Dan Dinneen (incumbent)	53,559.5	
Republican	William Querfeld	51,776.5	
Democratic	Felix E. Wilson	51,625.5	

1942 Illinois House of Representatives 28th district election
Party	Candidate	Votes	%
Republican	Homer B. Harris	47,444.0	
Republican	Dan Dinneen (incumbent)	36,858.0	
Democratic	Felix E. Wilson	25,834.0	
Democratic	James E. Roby	24.840.5	

1944 Illinois House of Representatives 28th district Republican primary
Party	Candidate	Votes	%
Republican	Homer B. Harris (incumbent)	15,870.0	
Republican	Dan Dinneen (incumbent)	14,857.0	
Republican	William Querfeld	8,804.5	

1944 Illinois House of Representatives 28th district election
Party	Candidate	Votes	%
Republican	Homer B. Harris (incumbent)	53,312.0	
Republican	Dan Dinneen (incumbent)	48,737.5	
Democratic	Felix E. Wilson (incumbent)	42,180.5	
Democratic	Paul H. Ferguson	40,681.5	

1946 Illinois House of Representatives 28th district Republican primary
Party	Candidate	Votes	%
Republican	Homer B. Harris (incumbent)	17,128	
Republican	Dan Dinneen (incumbent)	15,240	

1946 Illinois House of Representatives 28th district election
Party	Candidate	Votes	%
Republican	Homer B. Harris (incumbent)	45,100.0	
Republican	Dan Dinneen (incumbent)	40,221.0	
Democratic	Paul H. Ferguson	29,543.5	
Democratic	Felix E. Wilson (incumbent)	28,871.5	
