= Senator Hubbard (disambiguation) =

Henry Hubbard (1784–1857) was a U.S. Senator from New Hampshire from 1835 to 1841. Senator Hubbard may also refer to:

- Arthur J. Hubbard Sr. (1912–2014), Arizona State Senate
- Carroll Hubbard (born 1937), Kentucky State Senate
- Charles Hubbard (artist) (1801–1875), Massachusetts State Senate
- Chester D. Hubbard (1814–1891), West Virginia State Senate
- David Hubbard (politician) (1792–1874), Alabama State Senate
- Elbert H. Hubbard (1849–1912), Iowa State Senate
- John F. Hubbard Jr. (1822–1893), New York State Senate
- John F. Hubbard (1795–1876), New York State Senate
- John Henry Hubbard (1804–1872), Connecticut State Senate
- Levi Hubbard (1762–1836), Massachusetts State Senate
- Lucius Frederick Hubbard (1836–1913), Minnesota State Senate
- Nicholas L. Hubbard (1895–1983), Illinois State Senate
- O. P. Hubbard (1856–1948), Alaska Territorial Senate
- William Blackstone Hubbard (1795–1866), Ohio State Senate
