= Luis Tapia (artist) =

American sculptor

Luis E. Tapia
- Born: July 6, 1950 (age 76); Santa Fe, New Mexico, U.S.
- Known for: santos, sculpture, furniture
- Movement: La Cofradia de Artes y Artesanos Hispanicos
- Website: luistapia.com

Luis E. Tapia is a self-taught artist living in New Mexico best known for his innovative wood carvings that blend the local bulto tradition with contemporary culture and co-founding La Cofradia de Artes y Artesanos Hispanicos with artist Frederico Vigil. He has also done major restoration work at churches, including the San Francisco de Asis Mission Church in Ranchos de Taos. Tapia's awards include an NEA grant in 1980 and a New Mexico Governor's Awards for Excellence in the Arts in 1996.

== Art and exhibitions ==
Along with conventional santero religious imagery, Tapia incorporates prostitutes, gangs and lowriders. His santos are often noted for their use of color paint, including commercial watercolors, egg tempera and acrylics. Tapia began exhibiting his work at various fiestas in New Mexico around 1972. Since the mid-1980s his works have been exclusively sold through The Owings Gallery in Santa Fe where he has had several solo exhibitions. In 1986 Tapia was one of several artists in the Houston Fine Arts Center's traveling exhibition Hispanic Art in the United States : Thirty Contemporary Painters and Sculptors. In 2017 Tapia had solo exhibitions at the Museum of Latin American Art in Long Beach, California and National Museum of Mexican American Art in Chicago, and was the subject of the book Borderless: The Art of Luis Tapia. In 1992 Tapia and the artist, Bernadette Vigil had a two-person exhibition at the Albuquerque Museum, Albuquerque, New Mexico.

== La Cofradía de Artes y Artesanos Hispánicos ==
Tapia, along with fellow artists such as Frederico Vigil, Juanita Jaramillo Lavadie, and Teresa ArchuletaSagel, played an important role in La Cofradía de Artes y Artesanos Hispánicos or simply La Cofradía.

== Public collections ==
- American Folk Art Museum (New York)
- Autry Museum of the American West
- Millicent Rogers Museum
- Museum of International Folk Art
- New Mexico Museum of Art
- Roswell Museum and Art Center
- Smithsonian National Museum of American Art

== Awards and honors ==
In 2021, Tapia was awarded the Joan Mitchell Fellowship from the Joan Mitchell Foundation.

He is a recipient of a 2023 National Heritage Fellowship awarded by the National Endowment for the Arts, which is the United States government's highest honor in the folk and traditional arts.
