= Lockville =

Lockville may refer to:

- Lockville, North Carolina
- Lockville, Ohio
- Lockville Historic District in Massachusetts
