= Charlene Teters =

American painter

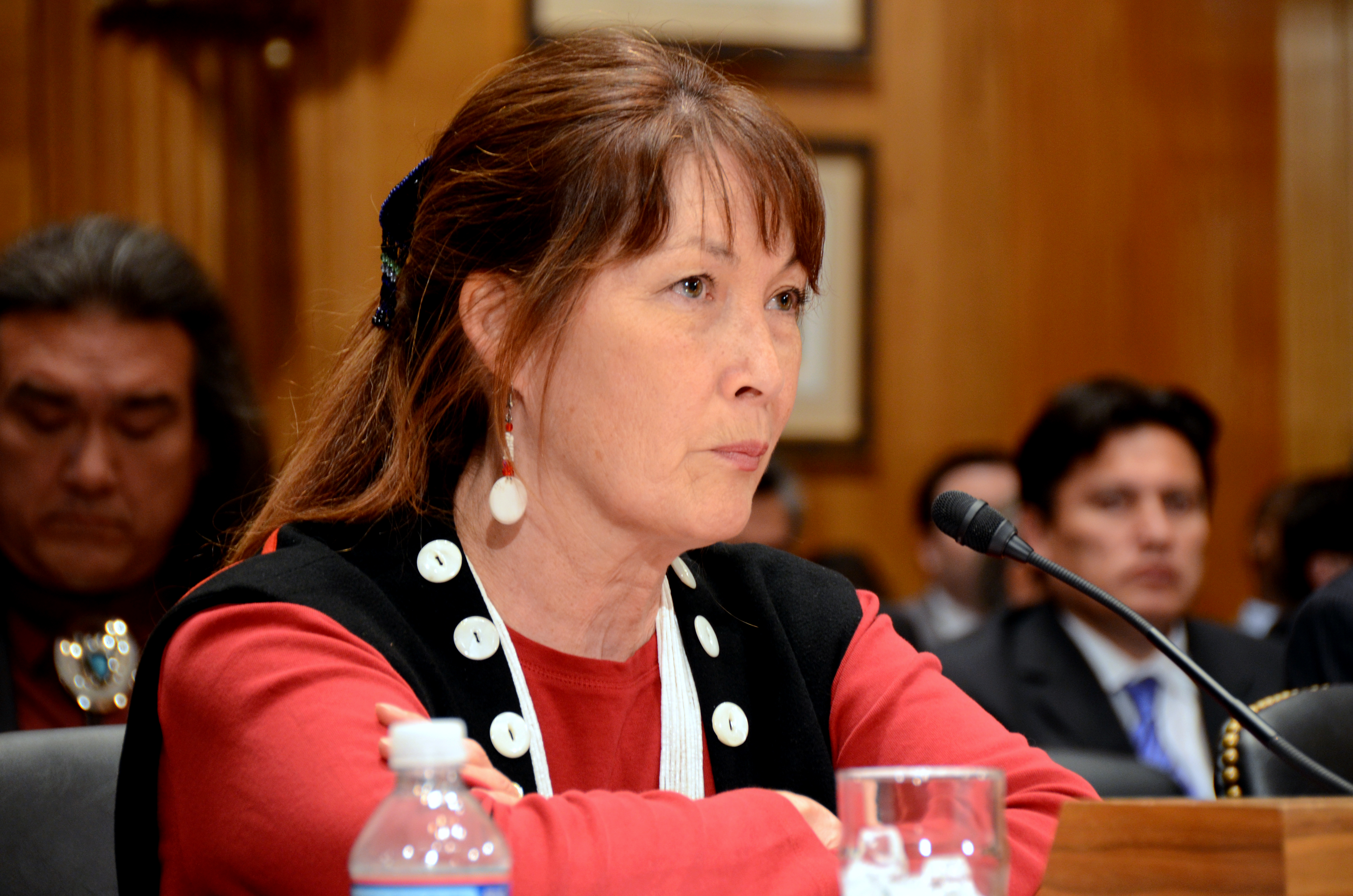
- Charlene Teters at Senate Hearing, May 5, 2011
- Born: April 25, 1952 (age 74); Spokane Indian Reservation, Washington
- Education: MFA University of Illinois, BFA College of Santa Fe (now Santa Fe University of Art and Design), AFA Institute of American Indian Arts
- Known for: Installation art
- Website: http://www.charleneteters.com

Charlene Teters (born April 25, 1952, Spokane, Washington) is a Native American artist, educator, and lecturer. Her paintings and art installations have been featured in over 21 major exhibitions, commissions, and collections. She is a member of the Spokane Tribe, and her Spokane name is Slum Tah. She was born and raised in Spokane, Washington, near the Spokane Indian Reservation.

== Education and activism ==
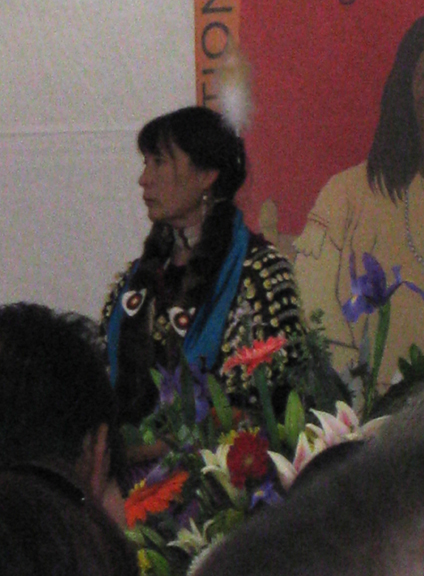
Charlene Teters in 2009

She has been active in opposing the use of Native American mascots and other imagery in sports since 1989. She is a founding board member of the National Coalition on Racism in Sports and the Media (NCRSM).

Beginning in 1984, she attended the Institute of American Indian Arts (IAIA), in Santa Fe, New Mexico, graduating in 1986 with an Associate of Fine Arts in painting. She then attended the College of Santa Fe (now Santa Fe University of Art and Design), graduating with a Bachelor of Fine Arts degree in painting in 1988.

In 1988, she began graduate studies at the University of Illinois at Urbana-Champaign's Department of Art and Design, eventually graduating with a Master of Fine Arts degree in painting. In 1989, she reacted strongly to the performance of a pseudo-Native American dance by a European American student portraying "Chief Illiniwek" at a university basketball game and soon after began to protest silently outside athletic events while holding a small sign reading "Indians are human beings." Her actions and those of other Native American students at the University of Illinois, such as Marcus Amerman, led to a strong upswing in efforts to eliminate Native American imagery in school, university, and university athletics throughout the United States and a film (In Whose Honor by Jay Rosenstein) was produced on the subject.

Teters also holds an honorary doctorate in fine art from Mitchell College in New London, Connecticut. On October 10, 1997, she was honored as "Person of the Week" by Peter Jennings on the ABC World News Tonight program, for her commitment to her work and her people.

In the mid-1990s Teters served as Senior Editor of Native Artist Magazine. She lives in Santa Fe, New Mexico. She retired from the Institute of American Indian Arts in September 2020, having served as Professor of Studio Art, Department Chair of Studio Arts, and then Academic Dean for Arts and Cultural Studies since 2015. From 2005 through 2007, she has also served as Hugh O. LaBounty Endowed Chair of Interdisciplinary Knowledge at California State Polytechnic University in Pomona, California.

Teters was the first artist-in-residence at the American Museum of Natural History in New York City, New York.

== National Coalition on Racism in Sports and the Media ==
The National Coalition on Racism in Sports and the Media (NCRSM) was formed in October 1991 at the Augsburg College meeting of American Indian dignitaries and activists in Minneapolis, Minnesota. It was created to fight the powerful influence of major media who choose to promote messages of Native American oppression. Holding demonstrations and marches outside numerous sports stadiums across America, the NCRSM has influenced the education effort on racial stereotyping and made it a household discussion topic. Components of major media which form public and government opinion include: film, video, sports entertainment, educational institutions, publications, news organizations, television, cable, satellite, internet, retail practices and merchandising, marketing, and radio.

At the creation of the NCRSM, the board of directors consisted of eleven directors including Teters as vice-president and senior editor, Clyde Bellecourt as the national director and the late Vernon Bellecourt as the former president and national representative for the NCRSM. Their mission was and still is rooted in the belief that the use of Indian and indigenous people as athletic mascots is dehumanizing to the Native American race as it perpetuates negative connotations and inaccurate stereotypes. The ultimate goal of the NCRSM is to remove the "desecration" of their spiritual practices that use feathers, paints, dances, music and instruments in the incorrect context. Finally, the NCRSM wants to discontinue the use of the indigenous person mascots in schools because they feel it is promoting the wrong ideals and images of the Native American people and inaccurately portraying history to the youth of America.

== Sports teams deemed offensive ==
Charlene Teters and the NCRSM have listed the following schools and teams on their home page to get certain universities and institutions in America to realize that the use of indigenous people is wrong as mascots.

- Anderson High School "Redskins", Cincinnati, Ohio
- Atlanta "Braves", Georgia
- Cleveland "Indians" Chief "Wahoo", Ohio
- Florida State University "Seminoles", Florida (have been given permission from the tribe)
- Marquette "Redmen" and "Redettes", Michigan
- Salmon High School "Savages", Idaho
- University of North Dakota "Fighting Sioux", North Dakota
- Washington "Redskins", Washington, DC

== Quote ==
"Often, people think about Native Americans as we were envisioned at the turn of the century. If we're not walking around in buckskin and fringe, mimicking the stereotype in dress and art form, we're not seen as real. Native Americans are here, and we are contemporary people, yet we are very much informed and connected to our history."

== Films ==
- Chief Video Documentary - The Chief and The Tradition
- In Whose Honor? (1997). Written and produced by Jay Rosenstein. Ho-ho-kus, New Jersey: New Day Films.
