= Chief Illiniwek =

Former mascot of the University of Illinois Urbana-Champaign

The Chief Illiniwek logo

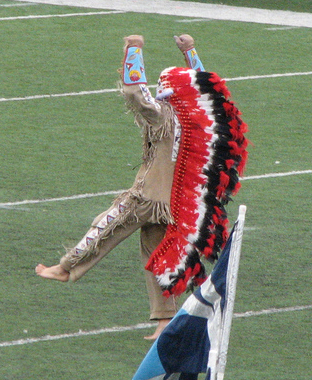
A performance of Chief Illiniwek at a football game in 2006

Chief Illiniwek was the mascot of the University of Illinois Urbana-Champaign (UIUC), associated with the university's intercollegiate athletic programs, from October 30, 1926, to February 21, 2007. Chief Illiniwek was portrayed by a student to represent the Illiniwek, the state's namesake, although the regalia worn was from the Sioux. The student portraying Chief Illiniwek performed during halftime of Illinois football and basketball games, as well as during women's volleyball matches.

Beginning in the 1970s, Chief Illiniwek became the center of a disagreement between fans and alumni who viewed the mascot as part of the UIUC tradition and many Native American individuals and organizations, social scientists, and educators who viewed such mascots as cultural appropriation of indigenous images and rituals that perpetuated inaccurate stereotypes about American Indian peoples. In 2005, Chief Illiniwek was one of 19 mascots cited as "hostile or abusive" by the NCAA in a policy that banned schools from full participation in postseason activities as long as they continued to use such mascots.

The University of Illinois retired Chief Illiniwek in 2007, with his last official performance on February 21, 2007. UIUC has not selected a replacement. A non-binding resolution to make "Alma Otter" the official mascot was placed on the spring 2019 student election ballot, but failed to receive a majority. In 2020, the belted kingfisher received a majority of student votes as a possible new mascot, which was reaffirmed in a 2025 student body referendum. In September 2020, the University Senate endorsed the kingfisher as the new mascot, voting 105 to 2 with 4 abstaining. Multiple Indigenous organizations have expressed support for the kingfisher. The kingfisher has won both support and opposition from alumni, though several online petitions continue to advocate for the return of Chief Illiniwek.

Supporters of Chief Illiniwek sometimes object to the use of the term "mascot," and instead refer to the Chief as a "symbol" of the university.

== Background ==
Chief Illiniwek and the Chief Illiniwek logo — a stylized front view of an American Indian face and headdress — are trademarks of the University of Illinois. Licensed use of the logo by the university has been increasingly restricted as a result of the controversy. Chief Illiniwek is not based on an actual American Indian chief, nor did a historical figure with this name ever exist.

Since he performed many of the functions of other schools' mascots, Chief Illiniwek is generally referred to as the university's mascot in media reporting and academic sources regarding the controversy. Chief Illiniwek predates the use of mascots by most sports teams, adding strength to the claim that the portrayal was never a mascot at all. However, in his final years, he did not perform at road games, since other Big Ten universities refused to allow the character to perform at their home games, citing him as offensive.

During sporting events, Chief Illiniwek was portrayed by a student selected via audition and wearing authentic Lakota Sioux (not Illinois Confederation) clothing. The portrayal also included a dance that originated from the first three portrayers' experience in the Boy Scouts of America, not Native American culture, that was taught by Ralph Hubbard, who had staged "Indian pageants" through the United States and Europe. This dance corresponded to the music and lyrics of the "Three in One" performed by the university band, which is an arrangement of three original songs entitled "The March of the Illini," "Hail to the Orange," and "Pride of the Illini."

== History ==
The origin of Chief Illiniwek dates to 1926, when Ray Dvorak, assistant director of bands at the University of Illinois, conceived the idea of having a Native American war dance performed during halftime of Illinois football games. The first performance occurred on October 30, 1926 at Memorial Stadium during the halftime of a game against the University of Pennsylvania. At the conclusion of his performance, Illinwek was met at midfield by a drum major dressed as the University of Pennsylvania's Quaker mascot, offered a peace pipe, and walked off the field arm in arm. Student Lester Leutwiler, an Eagle Scout, created the original costume and performed the dance based upon his experience as a Boy Scout. The expression Illiniwek (meaning "the complete human being - the strong, agile human body, and the indomitable human spirit") was first used in conjunction with the University of Illinois football team by football coach Bob Zuppke, referring to the Illinois Confederation of Native Americans who historically had inhabited much of present-day Illinois.

Another student, A. Webber Borchers, was the only Chief to ride on horseback around the field and solidified the Chief tradition, continuing the performances and soliciting contributions for a permanent costume in 1930. Since then, the costume has been replaced several times, most recently in 1982. The current costume was sold to the university marching band by Frank Fools Crow, chief of the Oglala Sioux (a nation unrelated to the Illinois Confederation), after being sewn by his wife. He visited the campus in 1982 to present the regalia during halftime of a football game at the request of then-Assistant Director of Bands and Director of Athletic Bands Gary Smith. The costume contained real eagle feathers, but because eagle feathers are sacred to Native Americans, and because they came from a species protected by the Lacey Act of 1900, the Bald and Golden Eagle Protection Act (1940), the Migratory Bird Act, and at that time the Endangered Species Act, the feathers in the headdresses worn by the Chief were replaced with dyed turkey feathers after requests from the family of Chief Fools Crow.

A total of 36 different students officially performed the role of the Chief. All but one have been men: one woman, Idelle (Stith) Brooks, served in 1943 due to the shortage of male students during World War II; she was called "Princess Illiniwek." No student portraying Chief Illiniwek was of American Indian heritage during the 82 year span, although Brooks, a journalism major who had grown up on the Osage Reservation in Fairfax, Oklahoma, was described as an "honorary princess of the Osage Indian tribe". Brooks weighed 90 pounds and her Chief regalia weighed 50.

The Chief appeared at the university's homecoming parade and pep rally until 1991.

With the passage of time, the actual descendants of the Illinois Confederation opposed the Chief (see Controversy, below). In May 1995, a WICD reporter interviewed members of the Peoria Tribe and their Chief, Don Giles said, "we do not have a problem with the mascot." However, in 2000, the tribal council passed a resolution opposing the university's use of the Chief. On January 17, 2007, the executive committee of the Oglala Sioux Tribal Council, issued a resolution asking that the University of Illinois return the regalia to the family of Frank Fools Crow and cease the use of the Chief Illiniwek mascot. The resolution was delivered to the university's board of trustees, UI President B. Joseph White, and Chancellor Richard Herman. The campus' Native American House was authorized by the Oglala Sioux to distribute the resolution to the public.

== Controversy ==
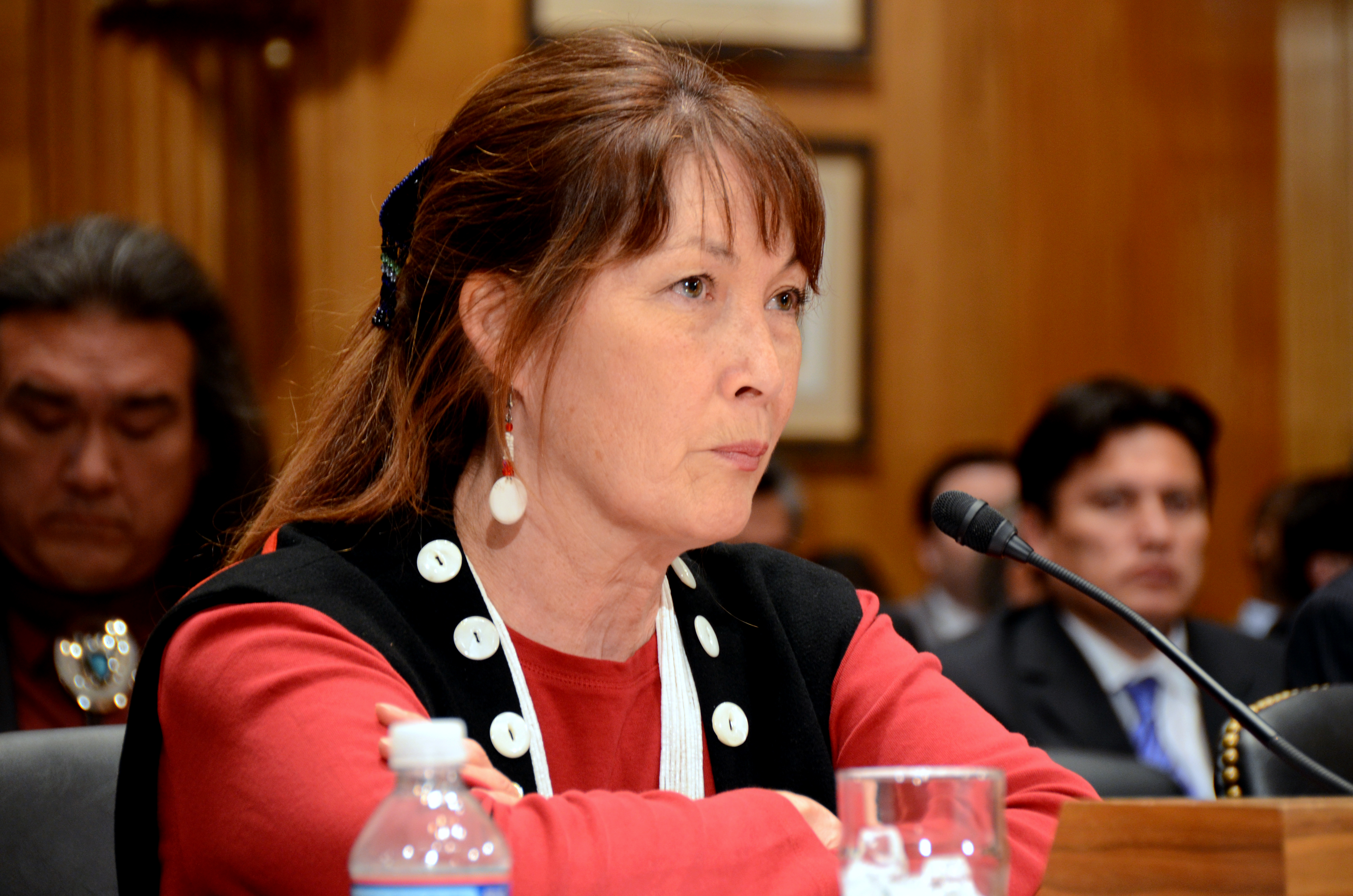
Charlene Teters, a member of the Spokane Tribe and former graduate student at the University of Illinois, was one of the earlier Native Americans to call for Chief Illiniwek’s retirement and was featured in the documentary "In Whose Honor?"

From the mid-1970s, the Chief was the subject of debate at the University of Illinois, including in the 1975 yearbook, The Illio, in which members of the Citizens for the American Indian Movement (AIM) were quoted opposing the Chief.

In October 1989, Charlene Teters, a graduate student from the Spokane tribe, began protesting the Chief at athletic events after her young son and daughter's humiliated reaction to the Chief's dance at a basketball game. Soon, other individuals and organizations began to support the Chief's elimination. Some academic departments adopted official stances in favor of retirement of the mascot. Other organizations, including the National Association for the Advancement of Colored People, the National Education Association, Amnesty International, the Modern Language Association, and Society for the Study of the Indigenous Languages of the Americas also took positions in favor of retiring the Chief. In November 1989, the Illinois state legislature passed a resolution in support of the Chief.

Student and alumni organizations, such as the Honor the Chief Society and Chief Illiniwek Educational Foundation, are dedicated to explaining and preserving the tradition of Chief Illiniwek. The Students for the Chief group formed in 1990. Among the national Native American organizations which called for the retirement of the mascot were the National Congress of American Indians and the National Indian Education Association. At the Urbana-Champaign campus, the Native American House, the American Indian Studies program, and the Native American student organizations all called for its retirement.

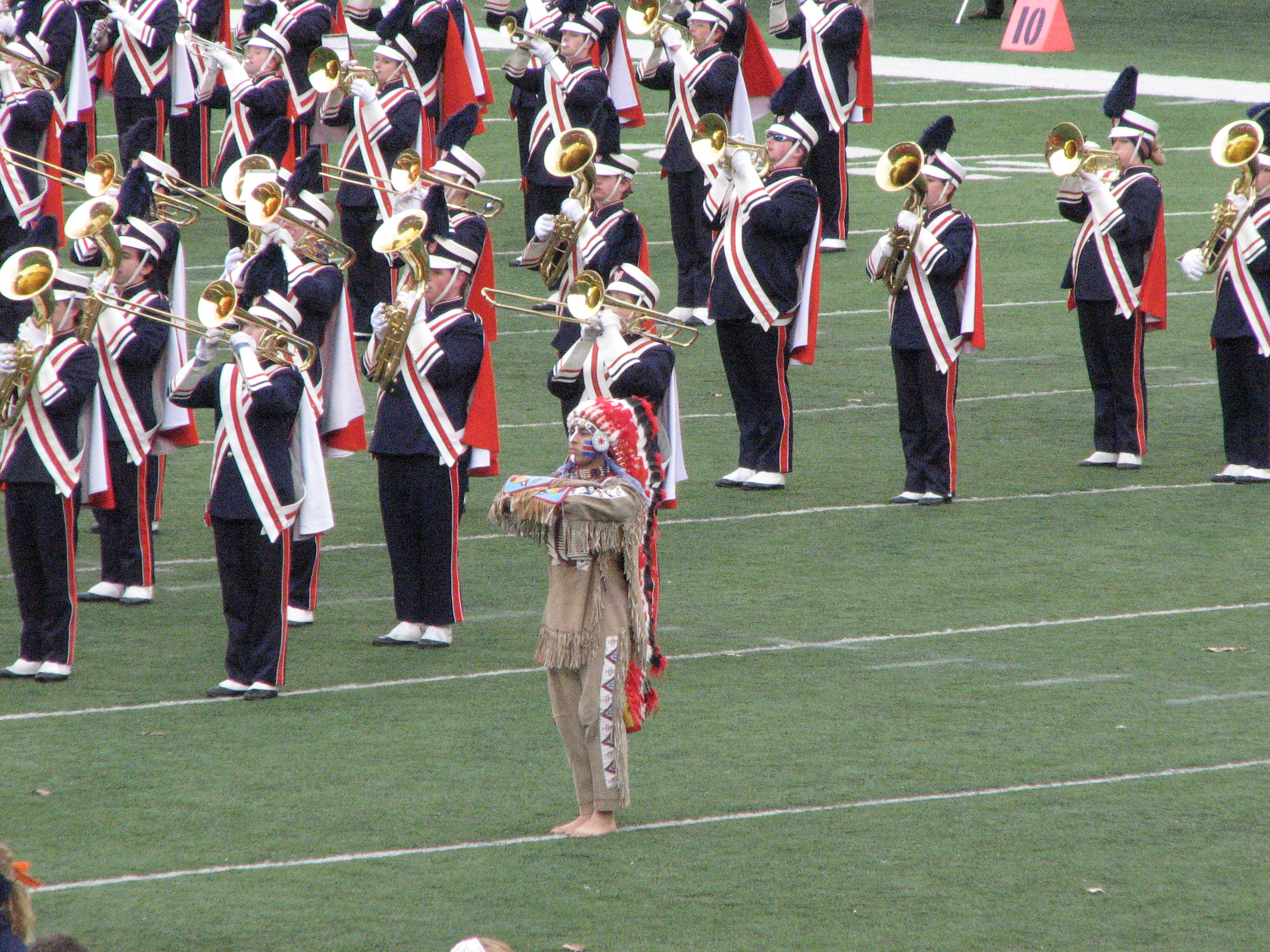
Chief Illiniwek with the University of Illinois Marching Illini

Those in favor of retiring the Chief contended that the Chief misappropriates and misrepresents Native American culture and perpetuates harmful racial and ethnic stereotypes. They argued that this obstructed the creation of a diverse and tolerant learning community, harmed the reputation of the university, and promoted an inaccurate image of Native Americans. Those in support of the mascot claimed that he was a revered symbol representing not only a proud people but the great spirit of a great university.

A 1995 ruling by the United States Department of Education found that the mascot did not violate Native American students' civil rights. Also in 1995, the state legislature approved a bill making the Chief the "official symbol" of the university, but Governor Jim Edgar's amendatory veto allowed the decision to remain with the university.

On January 13, 2000, the board of trustees of the University of Illinois passed a resolution concerning the issue of the continuation of the Chief Illiniwek performances at its athletic events. The resolution acknowledged the existence of a controversy. Pursuant to this resolution, the board retained Louis B. Garippo, a former circuit court judge in Cook County, to assist in conducting a dialogue on Chief Illiniwek. The Special Intake Session on Chief Illiniwek was held in Foellinger Auditorium on the Urbana campus on April 14, 2000. Garippo presided over the session, reviewed and compiled communications on the issue, and prepared a report to the board. Garippo's task was to convey respondents' opinions to the board, not to make a recommendation on the status of Chief Illiniwek.

In 2006, the University Board of Trustees opted to study the issue and passed a resolution calling for "a consensus conclusion to the matter of Chief Illiniwek." Many on both sides of the issue found this resolution problematic, given that former trustee Roger Plummer determined that a compromise on the issue was not possible. At that point, the board of trustees had not consulted on the matter with the faculty of the American Indian Studies Program.

In the past few years, opinion polls on the subject have not been much help in defining Native American opinion on the subject. In 2002, a Peter Harris Research Group poll of those who self-declared Native American ethnicity on a U.S. census showed that 81% of self-identified Native Americans support the use of Indian nicknames in high school and college sports, and 83% of Native Americans support the use of Indian mascots and symbols in professional sports. However, the methods and results of this poll have been disputed. A separate poll conducted by the Native-run newspaper Indian Country Today in 2001 reported that 81% of those polled "indicated use of American Indian names, symbols and mascots are predominantly offensive and deeply disparaging to Native Americans."

A non-binding student referendum on Chief Illiniwek was conducted in March 2004. Of the approximately one-third of the student body who cast ballots, 69% of the voters favored retention of the Chief. Faculty have tended to be critical of the Chief. Another non-binding student referendum on Chief Illiniwek was conducted in February 2008. Of the approximately 23% of the student body who cast ballots, 79% (7,718) voted to show support for Chief Illiniwek, while 21% (2,052) voted to not show support.

=== Documentary ===
In 1997, Indigenous U of I Graduate Student Charlene Teters (Spokane), was featured in a documentary, “In Whose Honor?” by Jay Rosenstein about Chief Illiniwek and Indigenous protests against the mascot. In the documentary, Charlene Teters shared the impact of Chief Illiniwek on her children’s self-esteem after taking them to an Illinois basketball game. The documentary won multiple awards and has impacted the debate about Native mascots at Illinois and throughout the United States. Other Native Americans interviewed in the film include Dennis Tibbetts (White Earth Ojibwe, Wyoming Wind River Shoshone), Michael Haney (Seminole, Lakota Sioux), Vernon Bellecourt (White Earth Band of Ojibwe), Karen Strong (Native U of I Grad student), and Durango Mendoza (Muscogee (Creek), Mexican). Some former portrayers of Chief Illiniwek (David Beckham) and Administration members were also interviewed in the film.

=== Position of the Peoria Tribe of Indians of Oklahoma ===
The Peoria Tribe of Indians of Oklahoma are the closest living descendants of the Illinois Confederation, having been relocated to Oklahoma in the 19th century. The position of the tribal leadership has evolved over the years. In a television interview with WICD-TV in 1995, Don Giles, then Chief of the Peoria Tribe, said, "To say that we are anything but proud to have these portrayals would be completely wrong. We are proud. We're proud that the University of Illinois, the flagship university of the state, a seat of learning, is drawing on that background of our having been there. And what more honor could they pay us?" Supporting Chief Giles was another tribal elder, Ron Froman, who stated that the protesters "don't speak for all Native Americans, and certainly not us."

Ron Froman was later elected Chief, by which time his views on the Chief Illiniwek mascot had changed. In April 2000, following meetings with American Indian students attending the university, the tribal council, with Chief Froman's support, passed by the margin of 3 to 2 a resolution requesting "the leadership of the University of Illinois to recognize the demeaning nature of the characterization of Chief Illiniwek, and cease use of this mascots [sic]". Froman said, "I don't know what the origination was, or what the reason was for the university to create Chief Illiniwek. I don't think it was to honor us, because, hell, they ran our (butts) out of Illinois." This puts Chief Illiniwek in a position different from that of the mascots of other schools such as Florida State University, whose American Indian mascots are not opposed by the leadership of the corresponding tribes. In 2005, a new Chief, John P. Froman, when asked his position by the NCAA, indicated that "the Chief was not representative of our tribe and culture, mainly because the costume is Sioux." In 2006, in response to a widely published column by journalist George Will in support of the mascot's use, he wrote a letter reiterating the Peoria Tribe's opposition to the mascot and decrying that the "University of Illinois has ignored the tribe's request for nearly five years."

=== NCAA involvement ===
In August 2005, the National Collegiate Athletic Association, the primary governing board for intercollegiate athletics, instituted a ban on schools that use what they call "hostile and abusive American Indian nicknames" from hosting postseason games, beginning February 2006. The University of Illinois was among the 18 schools subject to the ban which, among other things, prohibited the University from hosting NCAA-sponsored tournaments. The ban was soon expanded to include Bowl Championship Series-sponsored bowl games, starting with the 2006 football season. The university appealed the ban in October on the grounds that it violates NCAA bylaws and violated institutional autonomy.

On November 11, 2005, the NCAA, stating that it had "found no new information relative to the mascot, known as 'Chief Illiniwek' or the logo mark used by some athletics teams that depicts an American Indian in feathered headdress," upheld the ban on the University of Illinois. However, it did allow the continued use of the nicknames "Illini" and "Fighting Illini" by the university because they are based on the name of the state and not of American Indian descent. The university appealed the decision again on January 30, 2006, mere days before the deadline. While the NCAA Executive Committee granted an extension to April 28, the committee's next meeting, to other schools affected by the ban, the University of Illinois requested a longer stay until May 15, the end of the current semester. The executive committee ignored the request for a longer stay and denied the university's second appeal while indicating that no further appeals would be entertained.

The Chicago Sun-Times reported on August 31, 2006 that Chief Illiniwek would "no longer be an official university mascot" after the 2006–2007 basketball season. The paper also reported that the ownership of the Chief would be transitioned to an organization called the "Council of Chiefs" and made up of a number of people who have previously portrayed Chief Illiniwek. The next day, however, the university disputed the Sun-Times report. University sources confirmed that several former Chiefs had met with university officials to discuss preserving the mascot's tradition but stated that the so-called "Council of Chiefs" did not exist as a formally organized group. A University spokesman stated that "no decisions have been made" regarding the mascot's fate.

== Chief Illiniwek and the Fighting Illini ==
Some have incorrectly linked Chief Illiniwek with the nickname Fighting Illini. Though many assume that both are based on Illinois' American Indian traditions, the name Illini was first associated with the school by the student newspaper, which in 1874 changed its name from The Student to The Illini.

The addition of the adjective "fighting" originated about five years before the appearance of Chief Illiniwek, as a tribute to Illinois soldiers killed in World War I. Similarly, the on-campus football venue, Memorial Stadium, was named in honor of those fallen soldiers. As stated above, the NCAA has exempted the names "Illini" and "Fighting Illini" from its ban on American Indian imagery, as these names are purely based on the name of the state, and not a Native American tribe.

The state of Illinois was named by French explorers after the indigenous Illiniwek people, a consortium of Algonquian tribes which thrived in the area.

The word Illiniwek or iliniwek is the plural form of ilinwe and means "those who speak in the ordinary way," although it has often been mistranslated as "tribe of superior men."

== Retiring Chief Illiniwek ==
On February 16, 2007, Lawrence Eppley, chair of the board of trustees issued a unilateral ruling retiring Chief Illiniwek. Chief Illiniwek's last performance, by the final Chief, Dan Maloney of Galesburg, Illinois, took place on February 21, 2007 at the last men's home basketball game of the 2006–2007 regular season against Michigan, in Assembly Hall. As at the time, Chief Illiniwek also performed at women's home basketball games, the first halftime performance without the portrayal of Chief Illiniwek was the following night, February 22, 2007, at the women's basketball game against Michigan State.

On March 13, 2007, the University of Illinois board of trustees voted to retire Illiniwek's name, image and regalia.

In February 2007, the National Congress of American Indians thanked the university and commended them for retiring Chief Illiniwek.

== After retirement ==
On October 4, 2009, the University of Illinois gave the Chief Illiniwek regalia to the Oglala Lakota. The media were denied entry to this event, which was called a "private function" by associate director of athletics Dana Brenner. The university did not offer a public statement about the return.

Students and fans still chant "Chief" during the performance of Three In One during halftime. Since neither the NCAA nor the university have any control over what the fans chant, opposition groups have called to additionally ban the Three In One performance.

In April 2014, an indigenous student, Xochitl Sandoval, sent a letter to the university administration (which she also posted on her Facebook page) describing her thoughts of suicide resulting from the daily insults she felt due to the continued presence of "The Chief" on campus, including other students wearing the old image and name on sweatshirts and the continued "unofficial" performances by the current "Chief", Ivan A. Dozier. She stated that these thoughts came as a result of her feeling that she had no recourse because the university had not enforced its own policies regarding racism and the creation of a hostile environment for indigenous students such as herself; but had instead stated her only recourse would be personal action. Soon afterward there was a gathering on the Quad organized by the president of the Native American Indigenous Student Organization in support of Sandoval, and calling for further action by the university to eliminate the presence of the Chief on campus. The Campus Faculty Association (CFA) also issued a statement in support of Sandoval.

In May 2016, the university announced that a process was underway to select a "first-ever athletic mascot" for the university—the phrase evidently recognizing the argument by some Chief supporters that the Chief was not a mascot but a "symbol."

In August 2017, University Chancellor Robert Jones made the decision to ban the school's "War Chant", in response to critic claims that said the music stereotyped Native Americans and prolonged the divisive debate over Chief Illiniwek. ""Debating it was not going to do anything but kind of re-initiate a lot of the agony and the angst that have been a cancer that has been eating away at this university for more than a decade," Jones said of the closed-session ruling. Later in 2017, a protest interrupted the school's homecoming parade in response to the Unofficial chief marching with the Honor the Chief Society. Though touted as "peaceful", both the Chancellor and the Chief portrayer were escorted away by police after an officer was assaulted on the hood of the Chancellor’s car. As of 2017, no one had been charged or held responsible. The following morning, a number of members of one Sioux nation hosted a powwow on campus bearing a banner reading "The Fighting Sioux Support the Fighting Illini". These performers were part of an organization known as NAGA (Native American Guardians Association). "...the idea is to educate, not eradicate, and the idea is to improve what you have but never give up the opportunity to teach about Native Americanism." said Andre Billeaudeaux, executive director of NAGA. The Chicago American Indian Community Collaborative, a network of 16 Indigenous organizations and programs based in Illinois, considers NAGA as not representative of most Native Americans and has criticized the organization for promoting Columbus Day instead of Indigenous Peoples Day.

=== Proposed replacement mascots ===
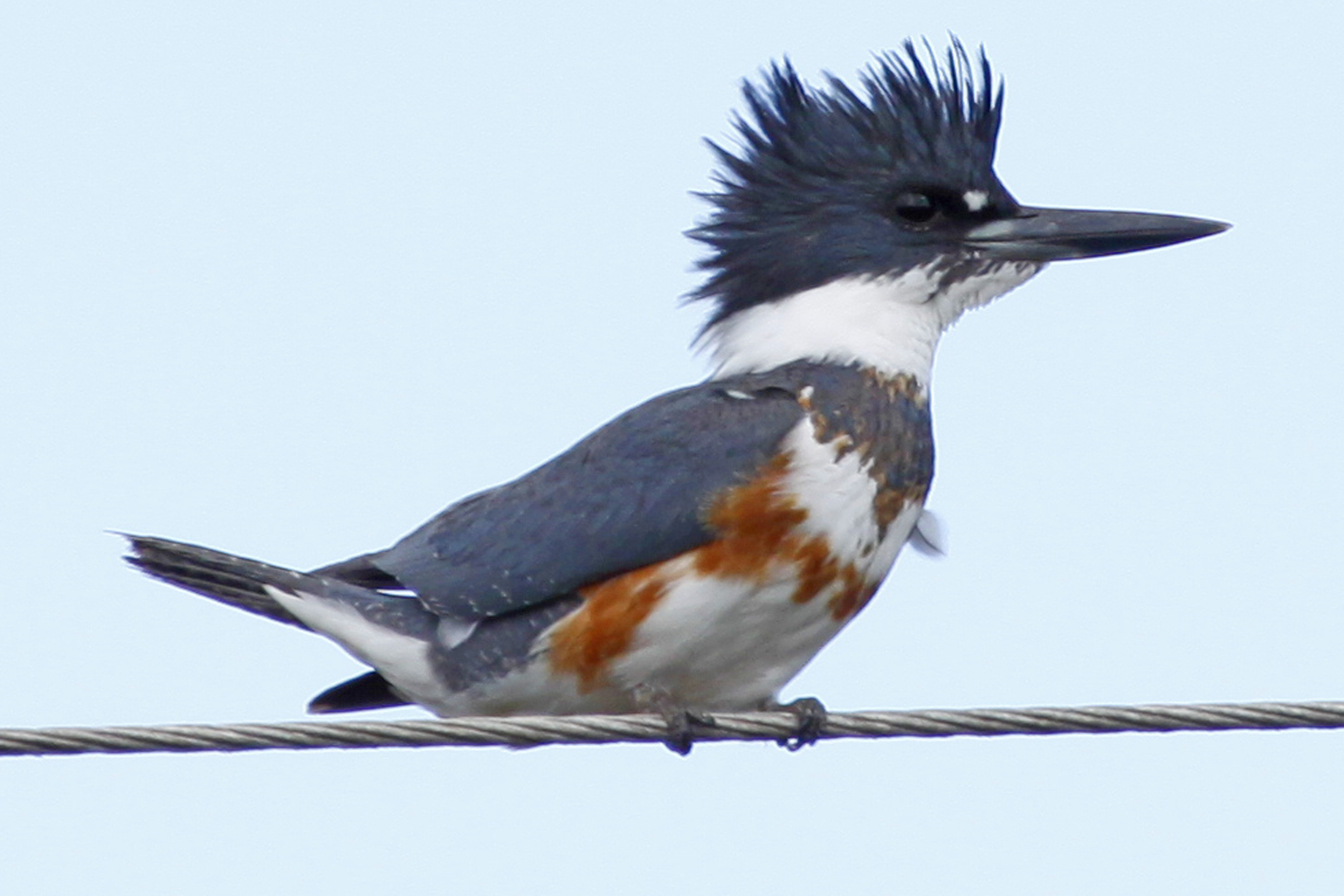
The belted kingfisher has been proposed as a replacement mascot

UIUC has not yet selected a replacement. A non-binding resolution to make "Alma Otter" the official mascot was placed on the spring 2019 student election ballot, but failed to receive a majority, although some saw the vote as a sign of progress. In 2020 the belted kingfisher received a majority of student votes as a possible new mascot. In September 2020 the University Senate overwhelmingly endorsed the kingfisher as the new mascot, voting 105 to 2 with 4 abstaining. In February 2025, students voted in a referendum for adopting a mascot, with a supermajority 76.36% in favor, 15.72% opposed, and 7.92% not voting.

The Illinois Kingfisher at the 2026 Final Four

The belted kingfisher, a bird local to Illinois whose female is orange and blue, has been proposed as a replacement mascot. The kingfisher as a mascot has been endorsed by the American Indian Center of Chicago, the Chicago Tribune editorial board, and the Champaign Audubon Society. In December 2022, the National Congress of American Indians endorsed efforts to find a replacement mascot, though the kingfisher was not explicitly mentioned. Supporters of the Kingfisher have dubbed the bird "naturally true to the orange and blue."

Belted kingfishers are birds of prey that can fly up to 45 miles per hour and dive two feet into water at 25 miles per hour while hunting fish. After it comes out of the water, the kingfisher beats the fish to death and swallows it whole. The aerodynamic beak of a kingfisher inspired the Shinkansen (Japanese Bullet Train)

In February 2023, the Association on American Indian Affairs endorsed adopting a new mascot, saying, “Retiring harmful imagery is commendable but not formally replacing that imagery allows for stereotypes to continue and fails to give the University community a new identity that is truly representative of them.”

In July 2023, the Native American Rights Fund endorsed the belted kingfisher as a replacement mascot.

In 2023, a group of students and faculty created a costume for the unofficial kingfisher mascot, and the kingfisher has made appearances on campus.

In April 2024, the American Indian Science and Engineering Society endorsed adopting the Kingfisher as the University's mascot

In 2025, "The King's Guard," which advocates for and coordinates appearances for the Kingfisher, became an official registered student organization (RSO).

In March 2025, the Nottawaseppi Huron Band of Potawatomi, whose members lead the Native American Heritage Fund, endorsed efforts to make the Kingfisher the University's mascot.

Some Illinois fans have expressed that they miss the Chief, but recognize that the Chief is not coming back, with some expressing openness to a new mascot instead of the status quo.

=== Selection of unofficial chief portrayers ===
In April 2008, the "Council of Chiefs", a group of previous Chief Illiniwek performers, named a student to portray the chief, although this portrayal is not sanctioned or endorsed by the university. Logan Ponce, a Latino student, was chosen as the 37th portrayer. Ponce expressed the ultimate goal of returning the Chief to the university. "It's unique to Illinois and has been such an important part of our history," he said. "It's part of our heritage. We look forward to continuing it."

In May 2010 the Students for Chief Organization chose a new student to serve as the 38th chief portrayer: Ivan A. Dozier, who is of Cherokee ancestry. (The Cherokee Nation opposes Native American mascots.) Dozier performed as Chief at the "Next Dance" event over homecoming weekend at the university in 2010. He also appeared in regalia at numerous sporting events throughout the years. Bennett Kamps was select to replace Dozier upon his graduation, with an initial appearance in February, 2016. In 2017 the portrayer was Omar Cruz Aranda.

=== Unofficial performances and events ===
An event called "Students for Chief Illiniwek Presents: The Next Dance," happened on November 15, 2008 following the football game against Ohio State University, in the Assembly Hall. "We want to do this event on a very exciting day for Illini fans and we want it to be a complement to that day's game," said Roberto Martell Jr., former president of Students for Chief Illiniwek and a junior in the College of Liberal Arts and Sciences. An open letter was sent forth by the Native American House encouraging the entire university community to speak out against the event.

On February 26, 2010 the webpage of Students for Chief Illiniwek posted nearly fifty email correspondences, obtained through the Freedom of Information Act, of several members of the university administration attempting to prevent the "Next Dance" portrayals. Parties involved include Renee Romano, Anna Gonzalez, Robert Warrior, and then-Chancellor Richard Herman. The emails include conversations between Romano and Richard Herman appreciating "the fact that we've been trying to get in the way of allowing the students for the chief to perform a dance in the assembly hall and "trying to think of a reason to deny them access to Assembly Hall on Oct. 2." The revelation of free speech violations by the administrators was criticized by free-speech advocates, including the Foundation for Individual Rights in Education, which currently gives the University of Illinois a yellow light rating.

In October 2012, the Chief made an unsanctioned halftime appearance at Memorial stadium, in the Homecoming football game against Indiana.

In January 2015, an unofficial appearance at Tuscola High School, by former portrayer Ivan A. Dozier, was cancelled. School officials removed the announcement post from social media saying they did not have the time or personnel to address the bad language and personal attacks that were made in the online comments. The School District announced via Twitter that the appearance was cancelled "In order to ensure highest level of student/community safety."

The Council of Chiefs, Students for Chief Illiniwek, and Honor the Chief Society posted events on Facebook encouraging fans to wear "Chief" gear to the basketball game with Purdue on February 22, 2018. Entitled "Paint the Hall Chief", and started by several female members of the community, the posting prompted the university to request that Facebook remove the events due to copyright infringement of the original Chief Illiniwek logo; which Facebook refused to do because the image used is significantly different than the original, constituting legal "fair use". At the game, about 100 protestors assembled at the main entrance to the State Farm Center displaying signs and chanting opposition to the Chief.

=== Chancellor's Commission ===
The effort to resolve the controversy by the chancellor, Robert J. Jones has included the work of a committee that issued a report of its "critical conversations" that included over 600 participants representing all sides, which remain sharply divided. The chancellor has appointed a Commission on Native Imagery: Healing and Reconciliation to implement the recommendations of the committee.

In 2019 the Office of the Chancellor issued a report with four goals and recommendations.

1. Provide closure, healing and reconciliation for stakeholders - Recommendations include a formal event recognizing the public retirement of Chief Illiniwek, establishing a plaque or monument outside Memorial Stadium commemorating the history, the original intent of the Chief, and the University’s decision to retire the tradition to better align with current educational perspectives on diversity and inclusion.
2. Facilitate the establishment of new traditions - Engaging all key stakeholders in identifying new tradition(s) such as music, symbols, branding, marketing, or a mascot that do not rely upon Native American images or traditions.
3. Remember the history of the Chief with a focus on both the intent and impact of the tradition - Development of an historically accurate account documenting the Illini, Fighting Illini, and Chief Illiniwek.
4. Honor and partner with the Native Nations for whom Illinois is their ancestral home

Both sides of the debate immediately criticized the report. Pro-chief members of the commission characterized the exclusion of Native American imagery from future traditions as "discriminatory" while opponents view the Chief as a racist past that should be not be commemorated.

Subsequent to the release of the commission report, several dozen current and former faculty (out of over 2,000 on campus) signed a letter urging the NCAA to once again prohibit the UI from hosting postseason competitions until it “fully complies” with NCAA policies on the use of native imagery in sports. The continued presence of the Chief's image on campus and the use of the nickname "Fighting Illini" were cited as examples of policy violations. Chancellor Jones responded that these were not violations.

==== Implementation Plan on Native Imagery ====
In December 2020 chancellor Robert J. Jones announced the Implementation Plan on Native Imagery, a set of reforms planned for the following three years. These included expanding the school's American Indian Studies program, repatriating sacred artifacts to indigenous people, offering in-state tuition to students from federally recognized tribal nations, having a campus historian develop an accurate history of the school's use of Native American symbols, and creating a council to develop new traditions for the student body. The plan does not address the adoption of a new sports mascot, or the possibility of changing the name of the Fighting Illini sports teams.

== Official Chief portrayal list ==
Name	Years of portrayal
Lester G. Leutwiler	1926-28
A. Webber Borchers	1929-30
William A. Newton	1931-34
Edward C. Kalb	1935-38
John Grable	1939-40
Glen Holthaus	1941-42
Idelle Stith*	1943
Kenneth Hanks	1944
Robert Bitzer	1945-46
Robert Bischoff	1947
James A. Down	1948-50
William G. Hug	1951-52
Gaylord Spotts	1953-55
Ronald S. Kaiser	1956
John W. Forsyth	1957-59
Ben Forsyth	1960-63
Fred Cash	1964-65
Rick Legue	1966-67
Gary Simpson	1968-69
John Bitzer	1970-73
Mike Gonzalez	1974-76
Matt Gawne	1977-79
Pete Marzek	1980
Scott Christensen	1981-83
William Forsyth	1984-85
Michael Rose	1986-87
Tom Livingston	1988-89
Kurt Gruben	1990-91
Steve Raquel	1992
Jeff Beckham	1993
John Creech	1994-95
Scott Brakenridge	1996-97
John Madigan	1998-2000
Matthew Veronie	2001-03
Kyle Cline	2004-05
Dan Maloney	2006-07

*Stith portrayed "Princess Illiniwek".

== Unofficial Chief portrayal list ==
Name	Years of portrayal
Dan Maloney	2008
Logan Ponce	2009-10
Ivan Dozier	2011-15
Bennett Kamps	2016-17
Omar Cruz	2017

== See also ==
- Peoria (tribe)
- Native American Mascot Controversy
- List of sports team names and mascots derived from Indigenous peoples
- List of ethnic sports team and mascot names (all ethnicities)
- Chief Illiniwek contrasts with the Chicago Blackhawks name and logo controversy because Chief Illiniwek is not based on a historical person; however, living descendants of Sauk War Leader Black Hawk, such as April Holder (Sauk and Fox, Wichita, Tonkawa) have called upon the Chicago hockey team to change its name and logo.

== Films ==
- Chief Video Documentary - The Chief & The Tradition
- In Whose Honor? - Jay Rosenstein Productions (1997) (Available for free on Kanopy with institution sign-in)

== Bibliography ==
- King, C. Richard, and Charles Fruehling Springwood, eds. (2001). Team Spirits: The Native American Mascots Controversy. Foreword by Vine Deloria Jr. Lincoln: University of Nebraska Press.
- Spindel, Carol (2002). Dancing at Halftime: Sports and the Controversy Over American Indian Mascots. Updated edition, with a new afterword. New York: New York University Press.
