= Olivia Romo =

American poet and water rights activist

Olivia Romo is an American poet, spoken word artist and water rights activist from Taos, New Mexico. Romo lives in Pojoaque, and works in Santa Fe, New Mexico.

Several of her poems and projects refer to water issues in relation to the acequia system of irrigation ditches in Northern New Mexico. Her work addresses the cultural heritage of water within agricultural communities as part of their current and ancestral ways of life. She is bilingual and her spoken word poetry is presented in the manito dialect of New Mexico. She has been named the New Mexico State Champion of Slam Poetry, and was the state of Nevada's first Poet in Residence. Her work has been written about in The New York Times, Albuquerque Journal, and Taos News. She has been described as a water rights activist, and has worked for the New Mexico Acequia Association.

== Early life ==
Romo is from Taos, New Mexico. She credits her parents for instilling in her the "literacy of the land, our culture, and to acknowledge our history that has shaped my identity and pathway." Her mother was a school teacher who encouraged her creativity by buying her blank books to fill with poetry and drawings. Her father was a rancher. Romo is of mixed Hispanic and Native American ancestry.

== Education ==
Romo received a dual bachelor's degree from the University of New Mexico in English and Chicana and Chicano Studies.

== Work ==
=== Poetry ===
In 2019, Romo collaborated with Juanita Jaramillo Lavadie, an educator and acequia water activist, and David Garcia, a luthier and music scholar on the project, Spinning with Water History, addressing the culture of storytelling in relation to the history of the acequias in Northern New Mexico. The project was in collaboration with the Taos Valley Acequia Association, Judy Torres, and Taos Youth. Acequias are ditches used to direct irrigation water within villages that have been in existence in Spanish-speaking settlements since the early 1500s. The interactive installation featured cuentistas (story tellers) spinning tales about water, while wool spinners used hand made tools to spin recycled cloth into ropes and cords that were then woven or plaited into mats and coverings.

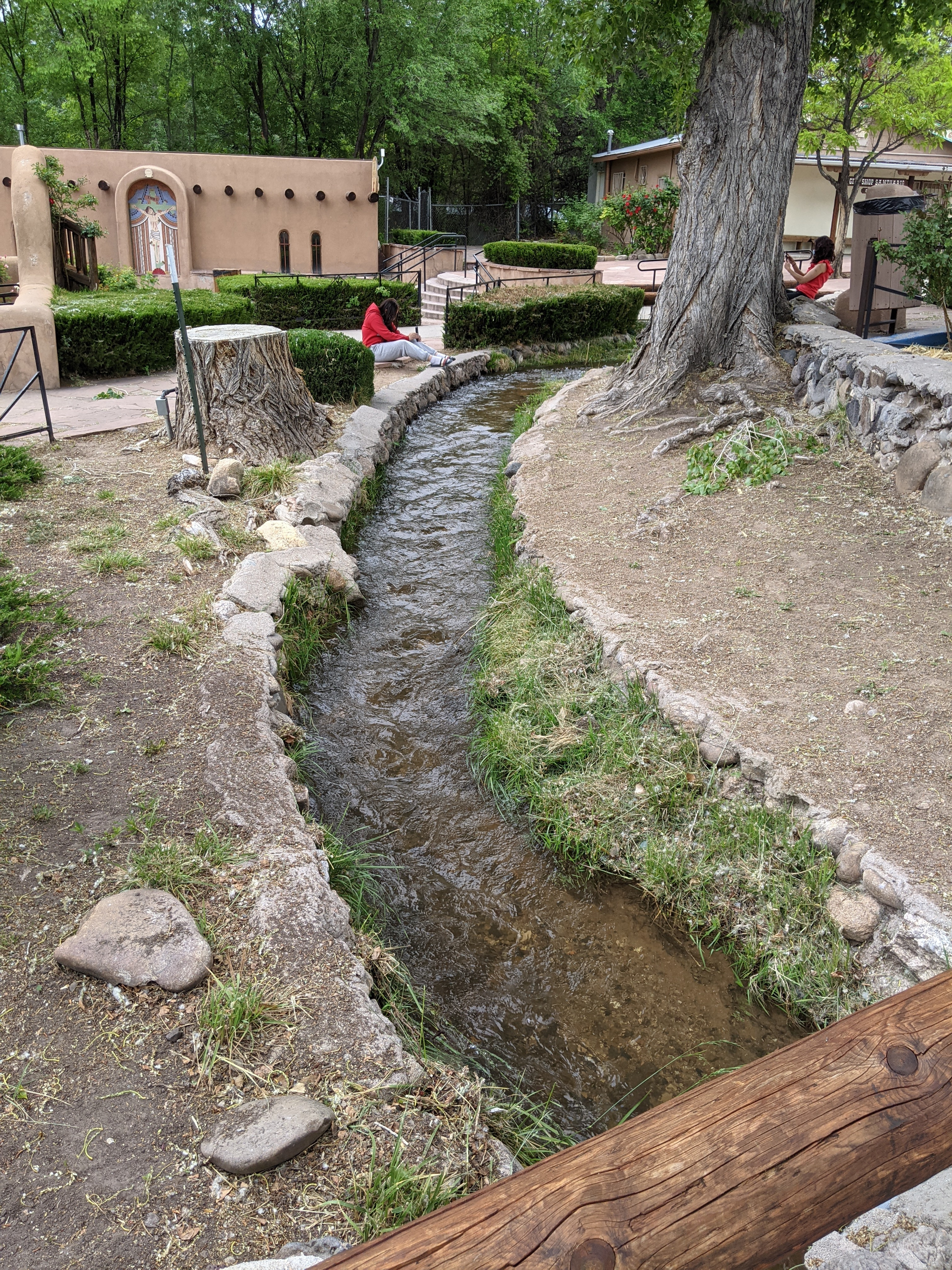
An example of a Northern New Mexico acequia, the Potrero Ditch at the Santuario de Chimayo

Also in 2019, Romo participated in Without Borders: Arte Sín Fronteras as an artist exploring borderlands. The show opened at the El Pueblo History Museum in Pueblo, Colorado, and travelled to the History of Colorado Museum in Denver.

Romo's poem, Bendición del Agua was inspired by the Acequia del Finado Francisco Martinez, an irrigation ditch that has existed in the community of Llano Quemado for centuries. Her spoken word performance of the poem is featured in a short film of the same title, produced by Daniel Sonis and New Mexico Poet Laureate, Levi Romero. Romo has described her experience: "As a young advocate for the acequias, I see a lot of the struggle and despair in our rural communities. This project reminded me about the strength, hope, and passion that I envisioned as a young woman, for agricultural communities in the Southwest to return to the land, their cultural heritage and to defend our ancestral ways of life." The film has been screened at multiple venues including the Santa Fe Film Festival.

Romo's poem, Roadrunner: The Chosen Prophet tells the tale of blue-eyed conquistadors and invaders, and of the Native Americans who suffered from smallpox. The poem ends on with a message of reconciliation; all of this is related through observations of the state bird, the roadrunner.

Romo is bilingual and she uses the manito dialect of New Mexico Spanish and New Mexico English that is specific to Northern New Mexico in her spoken word poetry.

=== Activism ===
Romo has been described as a water rights activist. She has worked for the New Mexico Acequia Association doing outreach as an advisor to acequia leaders regarding bylaws, water rights and transfers. The water issues in Northern New Mexico have been exacerbated by drought and climate change. Many acequias, and in turn crop production, have been affected by these factors. In 2021, the New York Times reported that 77% of the state of New Mexico was in severe drought.

== Critical reception ==
Romo's work has received attention from the press and was featured in the New York Times article, Work Songs of the Cowboy Poets. In the article, the writer Jared Stanley describes her poem, Chaquegüe, as an homage to blue corn porridge (similar to atole), a basic staple in New Mexican cuisine. The food becomes a metaphor for traditions such as the corn harvest and New Mexican Chicano culture, while highlighting water disputes within rural communities as well as large western cities.

Taos News referred to her work as magical realism. The Albuquerque Journal has described her poetic "voice" as an articulate expression of "four centuries of pain and pride." The Elko Daily Free Press describes her work and the film, Bendicion del Agua as an "awakening for younger generations to honor ancestral traditions that help lead to a sustainable future through acts of charity, respect, resiliency and a regard for water." Howard Yune has written in the Napa Valley Register that Romo's work as a "combination of loneliness and freedom" that brings to life "stories of lonely windswept plains, muscular horses and cattle roundups".

== Honors ==
In 2011 Romo was honored as the New Mexico State Champion of Slam Poetry. In 2013, Romo was nominated as a "Remarkable Woman of Taos" as an "outstanding Taoseña". In 2017 she was named Nevada's first Poet in Residence, an honor sponsored by Nevada Humanities.

== See also ==
- Environmental humanities
- Water rights
