= Juanita Jaramillo Lavadie =

Weaver and muralist

Juanita Jaramillo Lavadie (born 1949) is a contemporary weaver, textile scholar and muralist based in New Mexico. Her art is centered on the acequia system in Taos County, Northern, New Mexico and is influenced by traditional Hispano and Indigenous cultures. Her work primarily focuses on water rights in Taos County.

== Early life and education ==
Lavadie grew up in Northern New Mexico in a family of weavers, and four generations of family members involved in education. She is the eldest child of Eliseo and Amelia Jaramillo, who were educators. She studied music in high school and was a member of the youth choir at Our Lady of Guadalupe Church.

Lavadie attended New Mexico Highlands University, where she completed her Bachelors of Arts in Visual Arts and Elementary Education in 1973 and went on to earn her Master's in Graphic and Fiber Arts in 1974. After graduating, Jaramillo Lavadie went to Chicago where she worked with the post-humanist muralist Marcos Raya and the A.L.B.A the Association of Latino Brotherhood of Artists. She traveled to Mexico to study mural making in Mexico City. In 1980 she studied with Master Weaver Norma Maestas.

In 2018, she was attending Middlebury College to complete another Master's degree in English and multicultural literature.

== Work ==
In the 1970s, Lavadie was part of the Hispano-led La Cofradía de Artes y Artesanos Hispánicos (Cofraternity of Hispanic Artist and Artisans) a cultural and civil rights movement supporting "cultural pride and self-determination through arts", along with fellow artists Luis Tapia, Frederico Vigil, Teresa Archuleta-Sagel and others.

In 1977 Lavadie and Chicano Movement activist Enriqueta Vásquez, who had met when they attended the same panel of Chicano Movement speakers, created the mural Un Puño de Tierra which reflects the cultural values of Taos and the deep ties the people of the region have to the land. "Un Puño de Tierra" was restored in the summer of 2020.

Lavadie has worked as an assistant museum curator at the Millicent Rogers Museum and assistant curator at the Harwood Museum Foundation where she was also the director of their oral history project program. Both institutions are in Taos, New Mexico. Her career as an educator includes the Taos Day School, the Yachie School, Río Rancho Public Schools, Armijo Elementary School, Roots and Wings, and the Arroyos del Norte Elementary School.

Jaramillo Lavadie was a member of !CHISPAS! a group of artists who considered themselves "cultural warriors". Of her role as cultural-warrior-artist she has said “I see a warrior as a visionary. I see a warrior as someone who has made a commitment, I see a warrior as someone who has taken risks. I see a legacy of the warrior's efforts as having transcended more that one generation.”

Jaramillo Lavadie's work was included in the 1987 National Museum of Mexican Art exhibit The Barrio Murals. Her piece "Sabanilla Fina" was included in the Galeria de la Raza exhibit Women by Women curated by Linda Vallejo in 1985. In 2016 her work was included in the Ciboleros, Comanchero and the People Back Home exhibit at the Gutiérrez Hubbell House and Cultural Center, in the village of Pajarito, Albuquerque, NM.

In 2019 Jaramillo Lavadie partnered with Olivia Romo and David Garcia on an interactive installation related to the culture of storytelling in the history of the acequias, Spinning with Water Wisdom

== Awards and fellowships ==
Among the honors which Jaramillo Lavadie has earned are a National Endowment for the Arts Award

== Collections ==
Jaramillo Lavadie's work is held in permanent collections including:

- Harwood Museum of Art, Taos, NM.
- Museum of International Folk Art, Santa Fe, NM.
- Millicent Rogers Museum, Taos, NM.
- National Museum of the American Indian, Washington DC.

== Personal life ==
She was married to Eduardo Lavadie until he died.
