= Matt Donovan (poet) =

American poet and nonfiction writer

Matt Donovan (born Ohio) is an American poet and nonfiction writer. A native of Hudson, Ohio, Donovan graduated from Vassar College with an AB, from Lancaster University with an MA, and from New York University with an MFA. He teaches at Santa Fe University of Art and Design.

== Life and career ==
He is the author of two collections of poetry – Vellum (Mariner, 2007) and the chapbook Ten Burnt Lakes (Tupelo Press, forthcoming 2017) – as well as the collection of essays, A Cloud of Unusual Size and Shape: Meditations on Ruin and Redemption (Trinity University Press, 2016). His work appeared in AGNI, Blackbird, Poetry, The Kenyon Review, The Gettysburg Review, The Threepenny Review, and The Virginia Quarterly Review, among others literary journals.

He is the recipient of a Rome Prize in Literature, a Whiting Award a Pushcart Prize, a National Endowment for the Arts Fellowship in Literature, a Lannan Writing Residency Fellowship, the Larry Levis Reading Prize from Virginia Commonwealth University and a Creative Capital award.

He wrote the libretto for the 2018 chamber opera Inheritance, collaborating with his wife, artist Ligia Bouton, soprano Susan Narucki, and composer Lei Liang.

== Works ==
=== Books ===
- Vellum. Houghton Mifflin Harcourt. 2007. ISBN 978-0-618-82212-6. "Matt Donovan (poet)."
- A Cloud of Unusual Size and Shape: Meditations on Ruin and Redemption. Trinity University Press. 2016.
- Ten Burnt Lakes. Tupelo Press. Forthcoming 2017.

=== Essays ===
- "Villa of the Mysteries, Pompeii". The Threepenny Review. 131. Fall 2012.
