= Bernadette Vigil =

American artist and illustrator (born 1955)

Doña Bernadette Vigil
- Born: 1955 (age 70–71); Santa Fe, New Mexico
- Education: College of Santa Fe
- Known for: Fresco mural painting, oil painting
- Notable work: Oneness of Dance, Sueño Entre Sueño, Spiritual Warrior Within
- Style: Narrative, representational, magical realism

Bernadette Vigil (born 1955) is an American artist and illustrator whose work has been exhibited in museums and galleries nationally and abroad. She has produced permanent public artworks in the form of fresco murals for the cities of Santa Fe and Albuquerque, New Mexico. She has been commissioned to create religious frescoes in churches in New Mexico, and has been called a "master of the art of buon fresco" in the Santos Tradition. She has authored a book on Toltec spirituality, Mastery of Awareness: Living the Agreements. In 2002 it was published in Spanish as El Dominio de la Conciencia, and in 2005 it was published in German as Das Geheimnis der vier Versprechen.

== Education ==
Vigil attended the College of Santa Fe, New Mexico where she studied buon fresco and received her BA in 1980.

== Collections ==
- City of Albuquerque Public Art Program, Sueño Entre Sueño, (Fresco), 1994.
- Albuquerque Public Art/South Broadway Cultural Center, Oneness of Dance, 1995.
- Millicent Rogers Museum, Taos, NM, Los Musicos #6, 1989
- Museum of New Mexico, Santa Fe, NM. La Transcion, oil on canvas, 1992
- An archive of her papers is held in the Smithsonian Museum and the Archives of American Art.

== Artwork ==
=== Oneness of Dance ===
Vigil's mural Oneness of Dance (1994) is a permanent public artwork commissioned by the City of Albuquerque 1% for Art Program. The cultural references of the work include representing women, history, spirituality, mythology, and dream symbolism. Oneness of Dance is considered a fresco mural depicting dance as a form of universal language understandable by all nations.

=== Sueño Entre Sueño ===
Sueño Entre Sueño commissioned by the City of Albuquerque Public Art Program, depicts farmworkers in the field of corn below the phases of the moon. In the center of the mural is a figure painted in negative space that appears to be an elder man holding a cane with a dove and a flaming red heart within the figure. The farming symbolism also includes a female and male farmer, the latter is holding a stalk of corn, an essential food crop of the American Southwest.

=== Spiritual Warrior Within ===
Spiritual Warrior Within (1995) was a mural, commissioned by the city of Santa Fe Arts Commission for the exterior of City Hall. According to a publication of the City of Santa Fe, the fresco depicts "symbols of friendship, the struggle for good and evil...and the healing power of humans." Although this mural was painted as a permanent artwork for the city of Santa Fe, it no longer exists, having been destroyed by a contractor who was overseeing renovations of City Hall. The destruction occurred without the approval or knowledge of the artist, the Santa Fe Arts Commission, nor of the Historic Districts Review Board. The latter agency has authoritative oversight of all exterior alterations of buildings earmarked within the Santa Fe downtown historic district. There is debate whether or not the destruction of the mural was a political action against the mayor who had commissioned it, Debbie Jaramillo, Santa Fe's first female mayor, whose administration was marked by controversy.

=== Funeral with Shadow of Clouds ===
In Funeral with Shadow of Clouds, Vigil depicts a religious event occurring, more specifically, a funeral. In the painting, three figures in mourning standing over a burial pit; their shadows cast over the person who has died.

=== Nacimiento del Ángel (Birth of the Angel) ===
In the painting Birth of the Angel (1993), Vigil drew circular, planetary shapes that appear to recede in space, representing stages of birth for an angel. In the foreground stands an angel in white clothing that transforms into wings. Her fingers are spread to appear as if preparing to ascend to Heaven through the dark background filled with stars.

=== Did I Ever Tell You I Love You? ===
The angelic theme recurs in Did I Ever Tell You I Love You?, oil on canvas (1992). Below the moon and stars in the sky, two figures are depicted: an older man and a woman, both of which are rendered as angels. The older man is on his knees, mourning over the death of his wife. An angel hovers over him in the air, its hands reaching towards the man. The background is painted with a scene of a cemetery with six tombstones in a field.

=== Angélico Sonido ===
Inspired and similar to Renaissance painter Fra Angelico, Vigil's Angélico Sonido use of color differs from her other angelic themes in her artwork. Two men are depicted in this painting. They both wear black boater hats with their heads down, covering their eyes. The man on the left has his mouth open, revealing his top teeth. The man in the middle has his head lowered, covering his eyes even more than the man on the left, holding what appears to be a guitar. On the far right is a woman with wings (angel), who also holds and plays what appears to be a mandolin. The angel, as in most of her work, acts as a protecting force that motivates the two men.

=== Nunca ===
In Nunca, the piece is simple compared to her other works. All the audience sees is a person, a fire, and an angel. Bernadette Vigil's depiction of angels emphasizes the role a heavenly being plays, to protect, guide, and look over people even though they are not with them physically. The angel in Nunca hovers over the human from above and acts as a guide and protective force. Both the angel and the human are in the same position, knees bent with their hands up.

=== El Jardin ===
This wet-fresco mural of a Northern New Mexico scene, framed by two ears of blue corn depicts the local landscape, sun, moon, seeds blowing in the sky, and freshly picked vegetables laid before the viewer. According to the City of Santa Fe Arts Commission the mural took three months to complete.

== Publications ==
Vigil created the cover art for Bless Me, Ultima, a coming-of-age novel written by Rudolfo Anaya, originally published in 1972. Vigil authored the book, Mastery of Awareness: Living the Agreements, published in 2001 by Simon & Schuster/Bear & Company. The Roswell Museum published an exhibition catalog, Bernadette Vigil: The Spirit's Inner Journey, in conjunction with her one-person show in 1997.

== Exhibitions ==
=== Solo ===
All one-person shows cited in the chapter on the artist in Latin American Women Artists of the United States: The Works of 33 Twentieth-Century Women unless otherwise noted.

- 1982 – Mayor's Gallery, Santa Fe, New Mexico
- 1986 – Southwest Spanish Craftsman Gallery, Santa Fe, New Mexico
- 1987 – The New Hacienda Museum, Cieneguilla, New Mexico
- 1989 – Owings-Dewey Fine Art, Santa Fe, New Mexico
- 1990 – Millicent Rogers Museum, Taos, New Mexico
- 1990 – Jan Cicero Gallery, Chicago, Illinois
- 1993 – Milagros Contemporary Art Gallery, San Antonio, Texas
- 1997 – Roswell Museum and Art Center, Roswell, NM

=== Two-person shows ===
- 1992 – Albuquerque Museum, Albuquerque, NM. Bernadette Vigil & Luis Tapia: Paintings & Woodcarvings

=== Group ===
All selected group shows cited in the chapter on the artist in Latin American Women Artists of the United States: The Works of 33 Twentieth-Century Women unless otherwise noted.

- 1978 – Armory for the Arts, Santa Fe, New Mexico
- 1979 – Museum of Fine Arts, Santa Fe, Santa Fe, New Mexico
- 1980 – College of Santa Fe, New Mexico
- 1983 – New Mexico Highlands University Gallery, Las Vegas, New Mexico
- 1984 – Canyon Road Gallery, Santa Fe, New Mexico
- 1984 – Skylark Studios, Portland Oregon
- 1984 – Museo del Barrio, Austin, Texas
- 1985 – Willow Gallery, Santa Fe, New Mexico
- 1986 – The Harwood Foundation Museum, Taos, New Mexico
- 1986 – Santuario de Guadalupe, Santa Fe, New Mexico
- 1986 – Governor's Gallery, Landscape/Cityscape, Santa Fe, NM
- 1987 – Museum of Fine Arts, Santa Fe, New Mexico
- 1987 – St. John's College Art Gallery, Santa Fe, New Mexico
- 1988 – Albuquerque Convention Center, Albuquerque, New Mexico
- 1988 – Governor's Gallery, Santa Fe, New Mexico
- 1989 – Bottger Mansion Gallery, Albuquerque, New Mexico
- 1990 – Chicago Art Expo, Chicago, Illinois
- 1990 – Jan Cicero Gallery, Chicago, Illinois
- 1991 – Millicent Rogers Museum, Taos, New Mexico
- 1991 – National Museum of Ethnography, Warsaw, Poland
- 1991 – Guadalupe Cultural Arts Center, San Antonio, Texas
- 1992 – Eiteljorg Museum, Indianapolis, Indiana
- 1992 – Headley-Whitney Museum, Lexington, Kentucky
- 1992 – Plains Art Museum, Moorehead, Minnesota
- 1993 – Albuquerque Museum, Albuquerque, New Mexico
- 1994 – Roswell Museum and Art Center, Roswell, New Mexico
- 1994 – Museum of Fine Arts, Santa Fe, New Mexico
- 1996 – University Art Museum, Cinco Pintoras, Albuquerque, NM

== Bibliography ==
- Henkes, Robert. Latin American Women Artists of the United States The Works of 33 Twentieth-Century Women, 1999.
- "Mastery of Awareness". Book by Doña Bernadette Vigil, Arlene Broska | Official Publisher Page | Simon & Schuster, Bear & Company.
- "One of My Lives and Loves: Retablos". Rudyjmiera.
- "Sueño Entre Sueño: Bernadette Vigil and City of Albuquerque Public Art Program". CultureNOW.
- http://www.askart.com/artist_pubs/Bernadette_Vigil/102464/Bernadette_Vigil.aspx
- Dunbier, Lonnie Pierson (Editor), The Artists Bluebook: 34,000 North American Artists, page 479. AskART.com Inc. (2005)
- Watkins, T.H. and Joan P. Watkins, Western Art Masterpieces, page 119 (color image), (1996)
- Ellis, Simone, Santa Fe Art, page 112 (color image), (1993)
- Eiteljorg Museum, New Art of the West (Exhibition Catalog), page 58 (color image), (1992)
- Santa Fe New Mexican, Muralist Bernadette Vigil, August 1, 1994, Pg. 21
- Santa Fe New Mexican, Interview in Pasatiempo Arts and Culture magazine, July 26, 1990, Pg. 70
- Santa Fe New Mexican, An eye-in-the-sky perspective wins praise for Bernadette Vigil, April 5, 1991
- Taos News, January 30, 1997
- Santa Fe New Mexican, Stalking Your Own Reflection: The Path of the Spiritual Warrior, August 1, 1994
- The Santa Fe New Mexican, Muralist Seeks Project for Gang Members, August 1, 1994
