= The Screen (cinematheque) =

Movie theater in Santa Fe, New Mexico

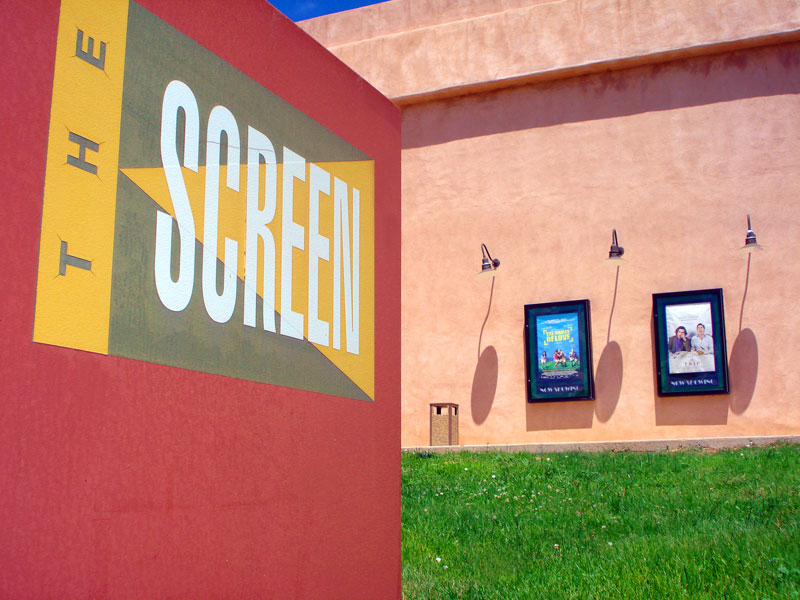
- The Screen in 2012
- Interactive map of The Screen
- Full name: The Screen at Midtown Campus
- Coordinates: 35.65500°N 105.97569°W
- Events: World cinema, Art cinema, Independent films, documentary films

Construction
- Opened: 1997
- Closed: 2020

Website
- ccasantafe.org/cinematheque

The Screen was an arthouse cinema in midtown Santa Fe, New Mexico, on the campus of the now-defunct Santa Fe University of Art and Design. The Screen opened in 1997, and closed in 2020.

== History ==
The Screen was founded in 1997 by Brent Kliewer, who is also the cinema's first curator. The Screen showed world, art, and independent cinema, as well as international performances of operas, ballets, and plays via satellite.

The Screen was used by the now-defunct College of Santa Fe, which became the Santa Fe University of Art and Design. The school's Moving Image Arts Department showed films for courses and student clubs.

In 2018, following the closure of the school and The Screen, the Santa Fe Center for Contemporary Arts announced plans to purchase and revive the theater, with financial assistance from the city.

The Screen closed in early 2020, coinciding with the COVID-19 pandemic.

As of 2023, a portion of the school's campus which included the former site of The Screen had been acquired by developers. with the intent to expand existing sound stages and related film production facilities on the site.

== Facilities ==
Built in a former soundstage, The Screen has stadium seating, a 16-speaker Dolby Digital surround sound system, and 35-mm and digital projection on a high-definition curved screen approximately half the size of an IMAX screen. The Screen also utilizes analog sound readers, maximizing the ability to play mono and surround EX prints, and operates simplex changeover projectors with adjustable shutter capabilities to play silent film prints. A satellite receiver is also used to display live operas, plays, and ballets.

== Curator ==
Brent Kliewer has been programming films in Santa Fe since 1982. A film curator, writer, and critic, Kliewer founded Santa Fe's Jean Cocteau Cinema in 1983 and in 1986 began building the film program at the Center for Contemporary Arts in Santa Fe. Kliewer was a film critic at the Santa Fe New Mexican and spent five years as a professor of critical studies in the Moving Image Arts Department at the then College of Santa Fe (later Santa Fe University of Art and Design). In the late 1990s, Kliewer helped to design The Screen.

== Notable guests ==
The following individuals presented films to audiences at The Screen:

- Alan Arkin, actor
- Cate Blanchett, actress
- Steve Buscemi, actor
- Lucien Castaing-Taylor, filmmaker
- Alan Cumming, actor
- Emilio Estevez, actor
- Coleen Gray, actress
- Dave Grusin, composer
- Mariette Hartley, actress
- Stan Herd, artist
- Don Hertzfeldt, animator
- Marsha Hunt, actress
- Juraj Jakubisko, director
- Burt Kennedy, actor
- László Kovács, cinematographer
- Ellen Kuras, cinematographer
- Lisa Law, photographer/activist
- Larry McMurtry, screenwriter
- Eddie Muller, film historian
- John Pilger, filmmaker and journalist
- Robert Redford, actor
- Mickey Rooney, actor
- Gaylen Ross, filmmaker
- Martin Sheen, actor
- Alain Silver, film historian
- Stephen Sommers, director
- Wes Studi, actor
- John Toll, cinematographer
- Constance Towers, actress
- Guinevere Turner, filmmaker
- Amy Vincent, cinematographer
- Vilmos Zsigmond, cinematographer
