= José Benito Ortega =

American sculptor

José Benito Ortega (La Cueva, 1858–1941, Raton) was an American sculptor, principally a santero.

He was born and died in New Mexico.
