= Virginia Romero =

Virginia Maria Romero is one of few non-Hispanic artists to master traditional New Mexican santero techniques. She was born to William Adelbert Phillip Holley and Victoria Theresa Mucha on 16 March 1952 in Sheffield Lake, Ohio, where she grew up as Ginny Holley. Her father was the son of William Holley, Sr. and Agnes Gifford Holley, to whom he was born on 28 November 1913. William, Sr.'s parents were Charles Holley and Katherine McCrone Holley who was from Dublin, Ireland. Her distant Irish ancestry is one of the principal inspirations for Romero's religious artwork. Romero's mother, Victoria Theresa Mucha Holley, the eighth of nine children who survived childhood, was born on 4 October 1916 to Józef Mucha and Agnieszka Szymezyk Mucha in Lorain, Ohio. Józef, a native of Russ, Poland, was born on 21 May 1883. He immigrated to the United States in 1896 where he found work as a shipyard worker in Lorain. Agnieszka was a native of Austria, Poland, where she had been born on 21 January 1882. Józef and Agnieszka wed on 24 June 1901 at the church of the Nativity of the Blessed Virgin Mary in Lorain. Her Polish ancestry is the other major inspiration for Romero's religiously themed art. Józef died on 25 July 1929, leaving Agnieszka to raise their large family.

Before she began to pursue art professionally, Romero was an artist on roller skates. Competing in Ladies Figure Skating, Ginny Holley Durand won the Great Lakes Five-State Regional Roller Skating Championship in consecutive years, 1979 and 1980. Her victories qualified her for a place in Classic Ladies Figure Skating at the United States National Roller Skating Championship. She made the finals of the competition both years; her highest finish was sixth in 1980. When Ginny was not giving dazzling performances in the rink she was showing her toughness. She earned a First Degree Black Belt in Taekwondo on 12 August 1983 in Akron, Ohio.

Romero has spent most of her adult life in New Mexico, having relocated to New Mexico in 1982. She married Alfonso P. Romero, a native of Northern New Mexico in 1987. Together they have one son, Zachary Louis William, who was born in 1989 Romero has a daughter named Holly Marie from a previous relationship. After living in Santa Fe for eight years, Virginia and her husband moved to Las Cruces in the early 1990s.

Romero is one of only a few non-Hispanic artists to master traditional New Mexican santero techniques. Romero's vocation as a santera was the result of personal crisis. Following her mother's death on 28 December 1998 at age of eighty-two, the artist began to make devotional retablos, eventually learning how to paint with natural pigments on pine panels with recipes for paints, gesso, and piñon varnish that master santero Charlie Carrillo wrote out for her on small pieces of paper, which Romero still has.

Romero's studies of the Crucified Christ are examples of contemporary expressions of a traditional genre of New Mexican folk art. She also reproduces her paintings on ceramic tile. Brother Richard Hirbe of the Friars of the Sick Poor of Los Angeles, California, discovered Romero's tiles at a gallery in Santa Fe and purchased several to affix to the front, back, and sides of the altar in the Motherhouse of the Friars of the Sick Poor. Cardinal William Joseph Levada, Prefect of the Congregation of the Doctrine of the Faith, was in Long Beach on a pastoral visit to the motherhouse and during Mass commented on the tiles, especially the one of Our Lady of Czestochowa, a piece inspired by Romero's Polish ancestors. The friars gave the tile to Cardinal Levada as a parting gift, and he said that he would give it to Pope Benedict XVI because Our Lady of Czestochowa was the patron saint of his predecessor, Pope John Paul II. Subsequently Brother Hirbe contacted the artist and related these events to her.

Brother Richard Hirbe, the founder and minister general of the Friars of the Sick Poor of Los Angeles, California, presented one of Romero's religious tiles, a representation of the Black Madonna of Czestochowa, to Pope Benedict XVI in 2009. Another piece of Romero's work found its way to the Vatican when Cardinal Levada presented one of Romero's retablos entitled "Unity," to Pope Benedict XVI in June 2010. Romero created this original piece, an image of Jesus, Guadalupe, and the Holy Spirit, specifically for Brother Richard Hirbe and the Friars of the Sick Poor of Los Angeles to present to the Pope as a gift of devotion.

Reverend Richard Catanach, rector of the Basilica of San Albino, commissioned santera Romero to create a retablo representing the church, to which Pope Benedict XVI, through the Congregation for Divine Worship and the Discipline of the Sacraments, granted minor basilica status in 2008. This retablo is on permanent exhibit at the Basilica.

In addition to her retablos, Romero also produces traditional New Mexican bultos. Her bulto of San Isidro is carried in procession each year on 15 May, the Día de San Isidro Labrador (the Day of Saint Isidore the Farmer), when the Bishop of Las Cruces performs the blessing of the fields at the New Mexico Farm & Ranch Heritage Museum.

The natural world also provides inspiration for Romero's work, particularly her newer work. This has also led her to incorporate images of wildlife in her religious painting. In this way she uniquely combines traditional New Mexican techniques and motifs with a very contemporary look. She is drawn to wolves, and there are many examples of her artwork that focus on these and other desert creatures.

Romero was asked to create a commemorative tile for the Senator Pete V. Domenici Public Policy Conference, an event begun in 2008 and held annually at New Mexico State University.

Commenting on the tile entitled "Mary Walks in Harmony," Romero stated that this piece of artwork was inspired by respect for the unlimited force and beauty of nature, of which we are all part. The use of symbolic imagery represents diversity, unity, and faith in each other and in our ability to contribute responsibly towards the coexistence of all living things. The hawk represents a messenger, the wolf represents a teacher, the turtle represents the earth and patience, and the woman represents birth and renewal. This piece also represents embracing the mystery of the unknown.

Among the collections that include Romero's artwork are those of: Basilica di San Marino al Monte, Florence, Italy; Cardinal William Levada; the Friars of the Sick Poor of Los Angeles, Long Beach, California; Holy Cross Retreat, Las Cruces, New Mexico; Maria Stein Heritage Museum/National Marian Shrine of the Holy Relics, Maria Stein, Ohio; Monte Olivito Maggiore, (outside Siena), Italy; El Museo Cultural de Santa Fe, Santa Fe, New Mexico; New Mexico Farm & Ranch Heritage Museum, Las Cruces, New Mexico; Our Lady of Guadalupe Shrine and Parish, Mesilla Park, New Mexico; Pope Benedict XVI; San Albino Basilica, Mesilla, New Mexico; San Miguel Mission, Santa Fe, New Mexico; Santa Francesca Romana, Rome, Italy.

Romero's art has been featured in dozens of gallery exhibits in Santa Fe and Las Cruces from 1997 to the present. Three major solo exhibitions have featured Romero: Black/White & Beyond at the Branigan Cultural Center in Las Cruces, Retablo, Metamorphosis, Vision: Art of Virginia Maria Romero at the New Mexico Farm & Ranch Heritage Museum from April through August 2009 and Retablos—A Cultural Legacy: Original Artwork by Virginia Maria Romero at the Abrazos Gallery at the Chamizal National Memorial in El Paso, Texas, from 14 August through 23 October 2010.

Romero is also an award-winning poet, having published two books of poetry, The Turtle Called my Name (Tortuga Press, 2005) and Under the Raven's Wing: Voices from Two Worlds with Hector Telles (Tortuga Press, 2005). She collaborated on Shalanitawu, a book of art and poetry with the late renowned poet, Keith Wilson, which remains in search of a publisher.
