= Louis B. Garippo =

American judge (1931–2016)

Cook County Circuit Court Judge
- In office 1968–1980

Personal details
- Born: June 4, 1931 Chicago, Illinois
- Died: May 31, 2016 (aged 84) Glenview, Illinois

Louis B. Garippo (June 4, 1931 – May 31, 2016) was a former Cook County judge and supervisor in the state's attorney's office best known as the presiding judge over the trial of John Wayne Gacy. He also made notable contributions during the trial of Richard Speck and the controversy which surrounded Chief Illiniwek.

== Early life and education ==
Garippo was born and raised in the Galewood neighborhood of Chicago, Illinois, on June 4, 1931. His father (Louis P. Garippo) was a committeeman of the 36th ward of Chicago and played a role in his future decision to make a living as a judge. Garippo received his bachelor's degree from the University of Notre Dame in 1952 after his completion of Fenwick High School four years prior. At Notre Dame in addition to his studies Louis was secretary of the bowling team for the year of 1950. From there Garippo went on to achieve his law degree DePaul University in 1955 and pursue his career as a criminal prosecutor.

== Professional career ==
Initially after Garippo's graduation from law school he was enrolled in the United States Army for two years before his first employment as an attorney. From the years of 1958 to 1968 he worked in the criminal division of the State's Attorney's office with the concluding title as first assistant state's attorney. In 1961 Garippo made contributions to the trial involving Richard Morrison and eight Chicago police offices known as the Summerdale Scandal. Morrison a self-proclaimed master burglar was arrested in 1959 in connection to a string of burglaries in Chicago in the years which had proceeded. In the months that followed the arrest the fact that Morrison was aided in these crimes by eight Chicago police officers came to light and he was released based on plea bargain for a testimony to convict those officers who had aided him.

The most notable case during his duration in the State's attorney's office was assisting prosecution who was convicting Richard Speck in 1966. Richard Speck, infamous for the serial murders of eight Chicago nurses on the night of July 14, 1966, was convicted by the efforts of William J. Martin and Garippo. The result being Speck was sentenced to death however the sentence was ultimately overturned due a 1972 Supreme Court decision, Furman v. Georgia, which temporarily abolished the death penalty. The case also served precursor for cases later to come in Garippo's career which also involved serial murder.

Garippo's time as a judge began with election to the bench of the Cook County Circuit Court in 1968 and concluded with his retirement in 1980. In 1970 Garippo issued a ruling which required journalists comply with a court subpoena under the event that they possessed evidence which would aid a potential conviction which was ground breaking for the time. The most notable moment of his career occurred in his final year as a presiding judge following the arrest of John Wayne Gacy on December 21, 1978. One of the most infamous serial murderers of the 20th century, John Wayne Gacy was arrested and tried for the murder of 33 young men who were buried under his house in Norwood Park Township, Illinois. Gacy's defense argued criminal insanity against the prosecution of William Kunkle, however Gacy was found guilty in spring of 1980. His sentences handed down by Garippo included 21 natural life sentences and 12 death sentences. Gacy remained on death row for 14 years before his death by lethal injection in 1994 at Stateville Correctional Center.

In 1980 following the Gacy trial judge Garippo retired from the bench to pursue the remainder of his career in private practice. In the year 2000 he was hired to write a report which covered fully the details which surrounded the controversy of Chief Illiniwek being a racially based mascot. The report did not include any recommendations but the mascot was retired in 2007.

== Personal life ==
Louis lived the majority of his life in Glenview, Illinois, with his partner Colette and was the father of four children. He died on May 31, 2016, at an assisted living facility in Glenview as result of congestive heart failure at 84 years old.
