= William C. Chynoweth =

American politician

William C. Chynoweth (August 28, 1861–November 11, 1935) was an American newspaper editor, businessman, marshal, and politician.

Chynoweth was born in Monroe County, Ohio. In 1872, he moved with his family to Macon County, Illinois. He went to the public schools and to Illinois Wesleyan University. He taught school and was involved with farming.

In 1888, Chynoweth moved to Rogers, Arkansas because of his health. While living in Rogers, Arkansas, he was an editor of a newspaper and served as postmaster. Chynoweth also served as a deputy United States Marshal. He moved back to Decatur, Illinois, in 1910, and was involved with farming, banking, and the insurance business. Chynoweth served on the Macon County Board of Supervisors and was a Republican. He served in the Illinois House of Representatives from 1925 to 1934. Chynoweth died from a kidney ailment at the Dr. George Laughlin Hospital in Kirksville, Missouri.
