= Karen T. Borchers =

American photojournalist

Karen T. Borchers (born 1957) is an American photojournalist, for the San Jose Mercury News since 1982. She retired from the Mercury News in July 2012.

Borchers graduated from Bowling Green State University with a BS in Photojournalism, and from Ohio University with an MA Degree in Visual Communications.

She worked at the West Palm Beach Post and the Dayton Journal Herald. Her work appeared in Harper's, and McClatchy Newspapers.

== Awards ==
Numerous photojournalism Awards from 1980 to the present.....In 1984 she was Runner Up for the National Press Photographer's Association "World Understanding" Award in the national yearly contest. She shared a Pulitzer Prize in General News, in 1990, with the SJ Mercury News staff, for coverage of the 1989 Loma Prieta earthquake.

- 1999 Spot News Photo 1st, Peninsula Press Club
- 2000 Newspaper Sports Action Photography Honorable, San Francisco Bay Area Press Photographers Association
- 2008 General News Photography 2nd, Peninsula Press Club
