= Santo (art) =

Wooden or ivory statues that depict saints or angels

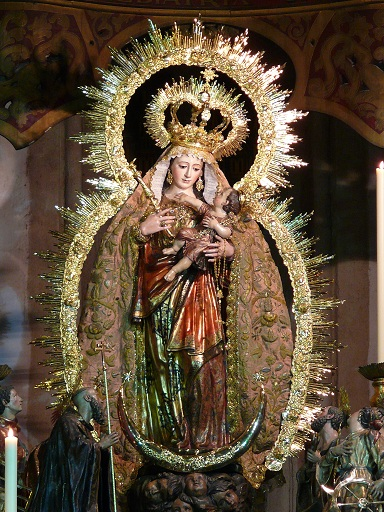
Regalia accessories for Our Lady, Queen of All Saints. Note the solid brass Aureola or halo. Spain, 2008.

A santo ('saint') is a religious statue in the Catholic traditions of Spain and the former Spanish Empire. They are usually made of wood or sometimes ivory and may be fitted with textile clothing. They depict the Virgin Mary, Jesus, saints, or angels. A santero (female: santera) is a craftsperson who makes the image. Some santos which have gained greater public devotion among the faithful have also merited papal approval through canonical coronations. Santos remain a living tradition of religious iconography and folk art in Mexico, the Philippines, Puerto Rico and some other Caribbean islands, South and Central America, and the Southwestern United States, especially New Mexico.

== History and terminology ==
Icons and other religious images were crucial for the conversions of indigenous peoples to the Catholic Church, which was itself an integral part of the Spanish colonisation of the Americas. However, long distances, inefficient methods of transportation, and high demand for such artworks limited the ability of ecclesiastical authorities to supply parish churches, especially those in remote outposts, with works of religious art from the Kingdom of Spain.

The practice of creating santos began in Spain, where mannequin-style religious images were commonly vested in ornate religious clothing, often expensive and funded by religious devotees. An early known example is the 1555 statue of Infant Jesus of Prague, already vested during the time of Saint Teresa of Avila. Customarily, jewels are various accessories were also added onto larger santos, a tradition still carried on today. While larger pieces are typically used in churches, many smaller ones are personal or family items of reverence, or kept as decorations. Santos are also common throughout Latin America, the Spanish Caribbean, and the Southwestern United States, as well as the Philippines, with distinct styles and traditions in each area.

Santo statues and statuettes, carved in the round, are commonly known as revultos or informally as bultos. They are usually made of wood. Larger scenic pieces, including multiple statues or done in bas relief, or simply painted on wood panels, and which may include non-figural iconography, are called retablos, originally altar backboards or screens, though today often adapted to secular artistic purposes in the Chicano art movement.

Among bultos, two distinct types are often noted, the bastidor ('frame', 'structure') style, a mannequin intended to be dressed with clothing and accessories, and the detallado ('detailed') style, with adornments painted on permanently (though sometimes also featuring added items). Bastidores often have interchangeable or posable arms, and sometimes feature a cage-like lattice (thus the name) to hold and shape the vestments.

Ivory was often cited as the best and most expensive material for carving santos. Elephant ivory, especially of African origin, has been restricted or banned from sale, distribution, or commercialization in Mexico, the Philippines, the United States, and many other countries. While exact laws vary by jurisdiction (from total bans to legal sale of antiques only), ivory is now rarely used. While the most economical modern type of santos are made of resin or fiberglass, and mass-produced, traditional examples are still made primarily of wood, sometimes with metal accessories.

== In the Philippines ==
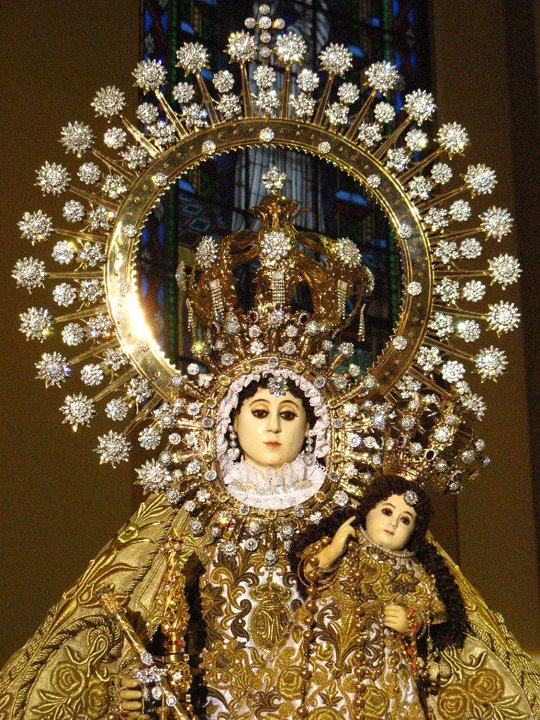
Often called the "Grandest Marian icon" in the Philippines, the image of Our Lady of La Naval de Manila is an ivory statue, with gold bullion embroidered vestments and jewelled crowns among its regalia. Santo collectors own medium-sized replicas of this image.

The santero culture in the Philippines is widely prevalent among Filipino Catholics, having been influenced by centuries of Spain colonial rule and various forms of folk Catholicism. The earliest recorded vested santo in the Philippines is the Santo Niño de Cebú, a baptismal gift given by Ferdinand Magellan to Rajah Humabon's consort in 1521.

In the Spanish period, only the nobility (principalía) and other rich inhabitants of the archipelago could afford santos of elaborate craftsmanship and ornamentation. The procurement and maintenance of santos today is still considered costly, the most expensive ones being antique images made of marfil (ivory), which is now less common due to wildlife concerns. From a religious perspective, the practice of owning and maintaining santo images are often regarded as a mild visual catechism for people, especially regarding the iconographic attributes attached to specific images. A santo custodian or family of custodians are called camarero (female: camarera, plural camareros, which in modern Spanish means "wait staff"). The role, if not hereditary, may be held by an organisation.

The most well-known santos in the Philippines are often Marian images, such Our Lady of Manaoag and Our Lady of La Naval de Manila, while those of Jesus Christ are the Santo Niño de Cebú and the Black Nazarene. A common medium for the base statue is the relatively soft wood of santól (cottonfruit, Sandoricum koetjape), as is that of Elaeocarpus calomala, while wood from its relative the batikulín (Litsea leytensis) is prized and more expensive, given its resistance to termites.

== In Puerto Rico ==
The santeros are venerated for their skill especially the ones in the Cordillera Central, who for decades have perfected the skill of making religious icons. A fourth-generation artist, Celestino Avilés Meléndez, from Orocovis has created pieces for the Vatican and a cathedral in Brooklyn, New York.

In 1953, 171 wooden santos from Puerto Rico were exhibited at the Cooper Union Museum for the Arts in New York.

== In the United States ==
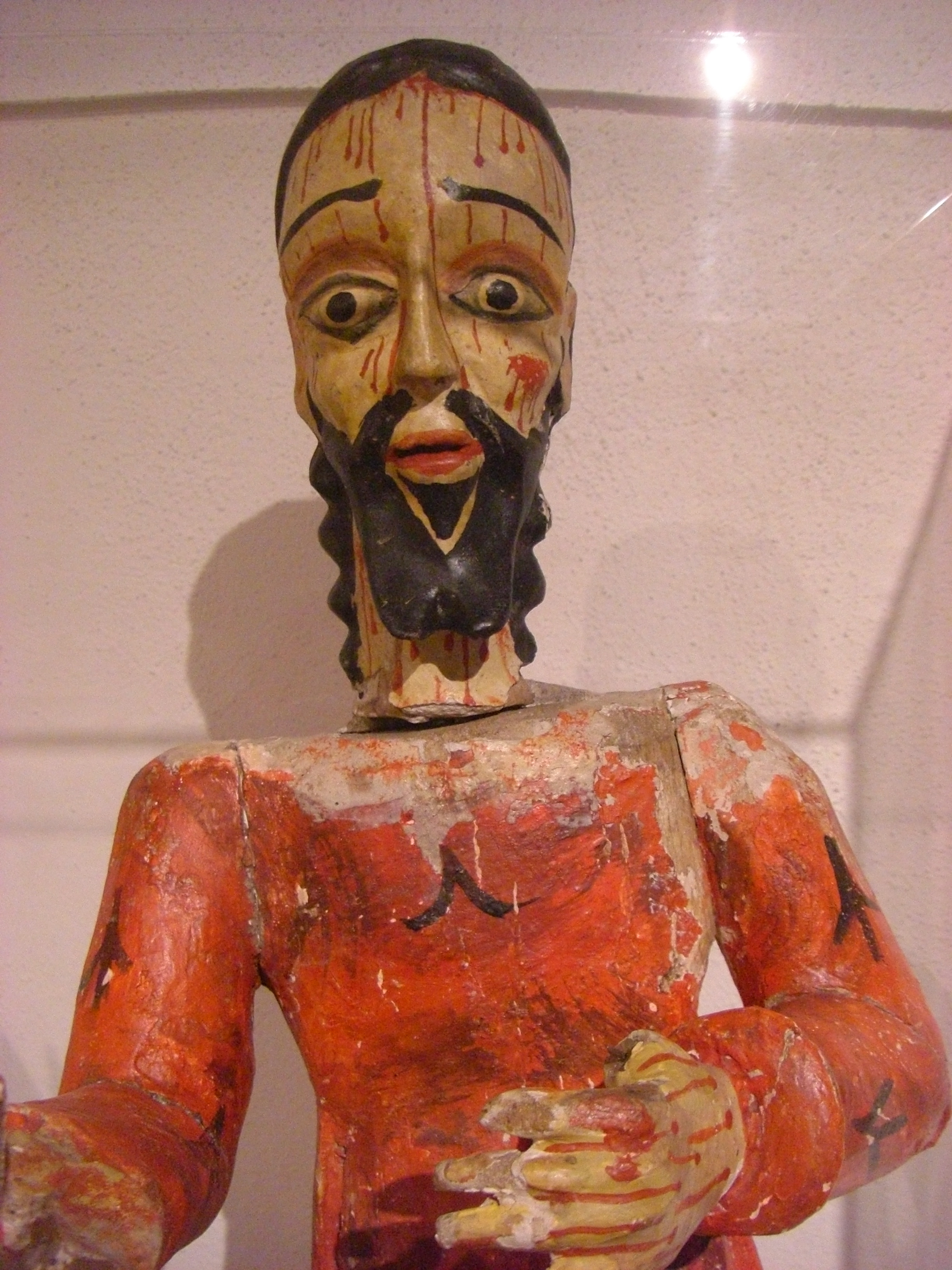
A Spanish colonial santo or bulto in a common style, with more caricature-like than realistic features; Harwood Museum, Taos, New Mexico

The tradition of wooden santo carving was preserved as a folk art in Northern New Mexico and Southern Colorado, where isolated villages remain relatively secluded to this day. Of particular note is the village of Cordova, New Mexico which has produced several well-known santeros; one was George López, who was awarded the National Heritage Fellowship by the National Endowment for the Arts in 1982. Another well-known santeros was José Benito Ortega whose works have been collected by notable museums including, the Smithsonian, and McNay Art Museum.

In this region, traditional bultos, unless made for specific church needs, are usually small, and intended for the home, or for the local church or morada. They are typically detallados, without many if any accessories (that is, with clothing and the like carved and painted on the statuettes, though often bearing a separate wooden staff or other bit of regalia). They are most often made of cottonwood, pine or aspen. Many are multi-piece, with hands, head, and other details carved separately and added to a body that is otherwise carved from single block of wood. Nevertheless, the region also has a long tradition of larger, articulated, and often bloody Crucifixion bultos. A santero usually carves a bulto with a knife or other wood carving tools, and then covers it with gesso, a mixture of native gypsum and glue, to prepare it for painting. Some contemporary santeros still use paints from homemade pigments.

Some santeros supplement their income by making bultos to sell to tourists, especially at the annual Santa Fe International Folk Art Market and Spanish Market, including whimsical items, such as bultos of Saint Patrick, who does not figure in Spanish Catholicism. One such San Patricio figurine, by Santa Fe santero Frank Brito Sr. (1922–2005) is in the permanent collection of the Smithsonian Museum of American Art since 1997; many more traditional santos and other carvings by him are in the Museum of International Folk Art, along with those of other santeros from various parts of the world. Entire nativity scenes in bulto style are also popular tourist items.

== Attire and accessories ==
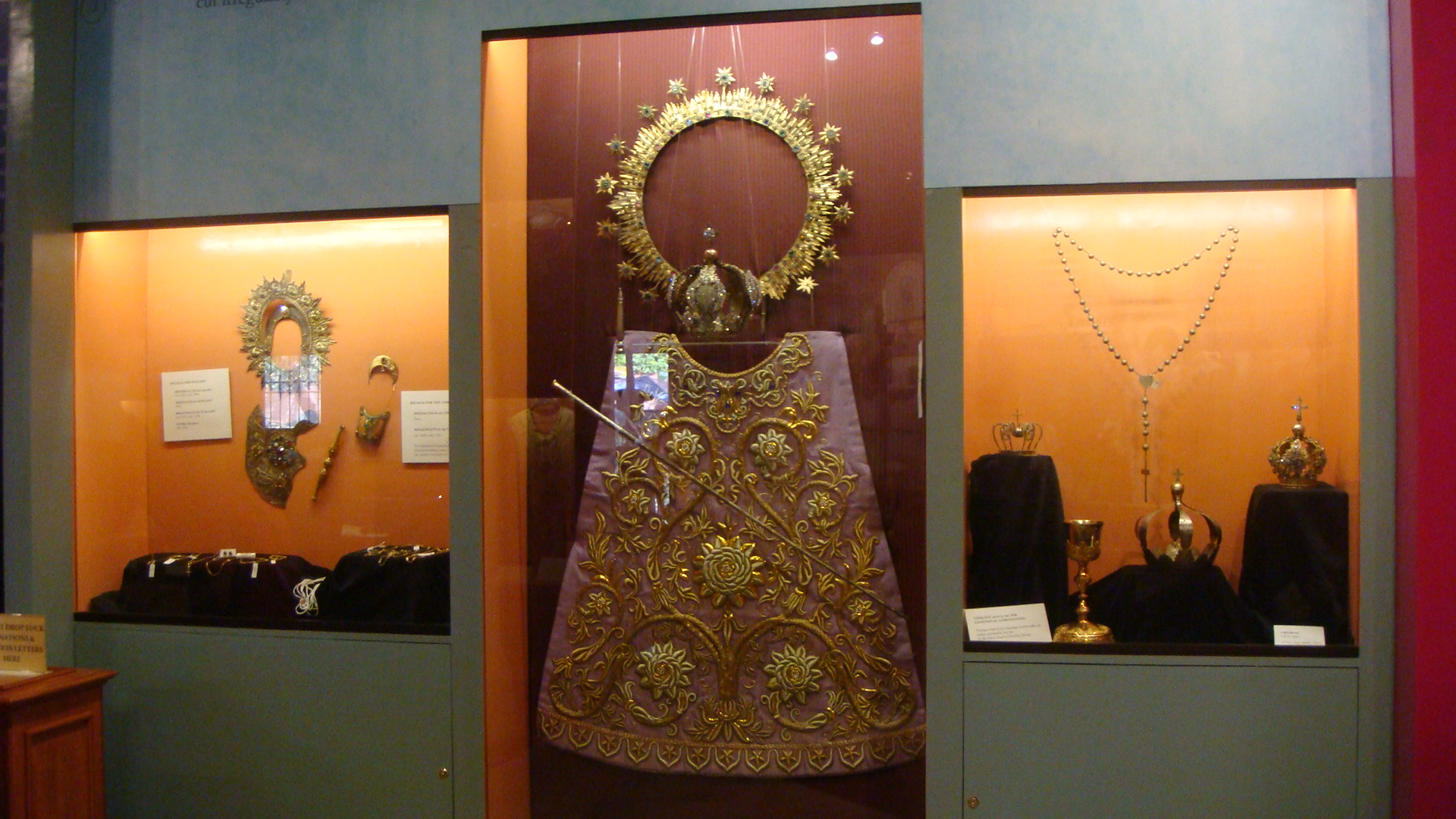
Preserved regalia of Our Lady of Manaoag, in the ecclesiastical museum of its basilica, Pangasinan, Philippines. Many santo collectors also seek accessories and vestments like these, and donate these to publicly venerated images.

The wardrobe items of more elaborate santos, especially bastidor mannequins, are often expensive, such as pieces woven with gold thread. The most expensive kind is known in the Philippines as inuod (Tagalog, 'wormed'), which uses a type of French gold bullion thread to make high-relief, embroidered floral and plant patterns on the statue's clothing.

Headdresses are also an integral part of a santos, often encrusted with costume jewelry (such as paste and rhinestones) or real precious stones, to symbolize the spiritual wealth of the saint. The most common headdress for images is the aureola (halo) behind or above the head, while royal figures wear an additional corona (crown or coronet).

A halo decorating the perimeter of the face, known as a resplendor or rostrillo, is almost always used, but not restricted to, images of the Blessed Virgin Mary, pointing to her traditional identification as the “Woman clothed in the sun” in the Apocalypse. Images of Jesus are readily identified by the Tres Potencias ('Three Powers') halo, a set of three rays protruding from Christ's head at acute angles. These are never used for other subjects, and are interpreted to mean various things such as Christ's three faculties of will, memory, and understanding. Triangular haloes are exclusive to very rare set images of the Blessed Trinity, and some saints occasionally bear a luna or moon-shaped headband. Some female saints, particularly virgin martyrs, don diadems or tiaras; female saints are also usually given a parure or other jewellery from earrings, to necklaces, rings, and bracelets.

While there are cheap plastic crowns, haloes, and other metal accessories associated with santos, others are made of aluminum or, traditionally, tin (tinwork remains a major folk art form in general in Mexico and New Mexico). These adornments are sometimes gold-plated for a richer effect. A more expensive type in the Philippines is made of solid brass, and fashioned in the pukpók (Tagalog for 'hammered') repoussé method by an artisan. The costliest of crowns are made of solid sterling silver or gold with actual gemstones and are often reserved for images owned by wealthy clerics and cathedrals. Another style is estofado, referring to dented holes placed on gold or silver foiling on the halos or the body of a statue, creating a reflective effect when placed in the light.

Other wooden, metallic, or composite accessories, which depend on the iconographic attributes of the subject, range from a long marshal's baton for some Marian images (signifying her military patronage as the ceremonial commander of a unit), a scepter or staff for various saints, a globus cruciger (usually for images of the Christ Child), a rosary, wings, flowers, a weapon or implement used in a saint's martyrdom, or some other object associated with the figure (e.g. small animals with Saint Francis of Assisi).

Another costly item involved in the maintenance of a large santo is its carroza (carriage), used as the image's vehicle during religious processions in rural Mexico and the Philippines, such as those of a town fiesta, and Holy Week. These often have embossed metal decorations, the most expensive being pure silver, and layered cloths forming a skirt to hide the wheels of the carriage, along with carved sides representing episodes from the Gospels, such as the Passion narrative, or scenes, symbols, and objects associated with the saint.

== Notable santeros ==
- Virginia Romero (born 1952), a master artist of traditional New Mexican santero
- Bernadette and Frederico Vigil of Santa Fe, New Mexico; sibling santos painters in the buon fresco style
