= Lockville, Ohio =

Unincorporated community in Ohio, U.S.

Coordinates: 39°49′07″N 82°44′01″W

Lockville is an unincorporated community in Fairfield County, in the U.S. state of Ohio.

== History ==
Lockville was named for the locks on a nearby canal. A post office called Lockville was established in 1849 and remained in operation until 1921.

== Notable people ==
Charles M. Borchers, U.S. Representative from Illinois
