= Charles M. Borchers =

American politician

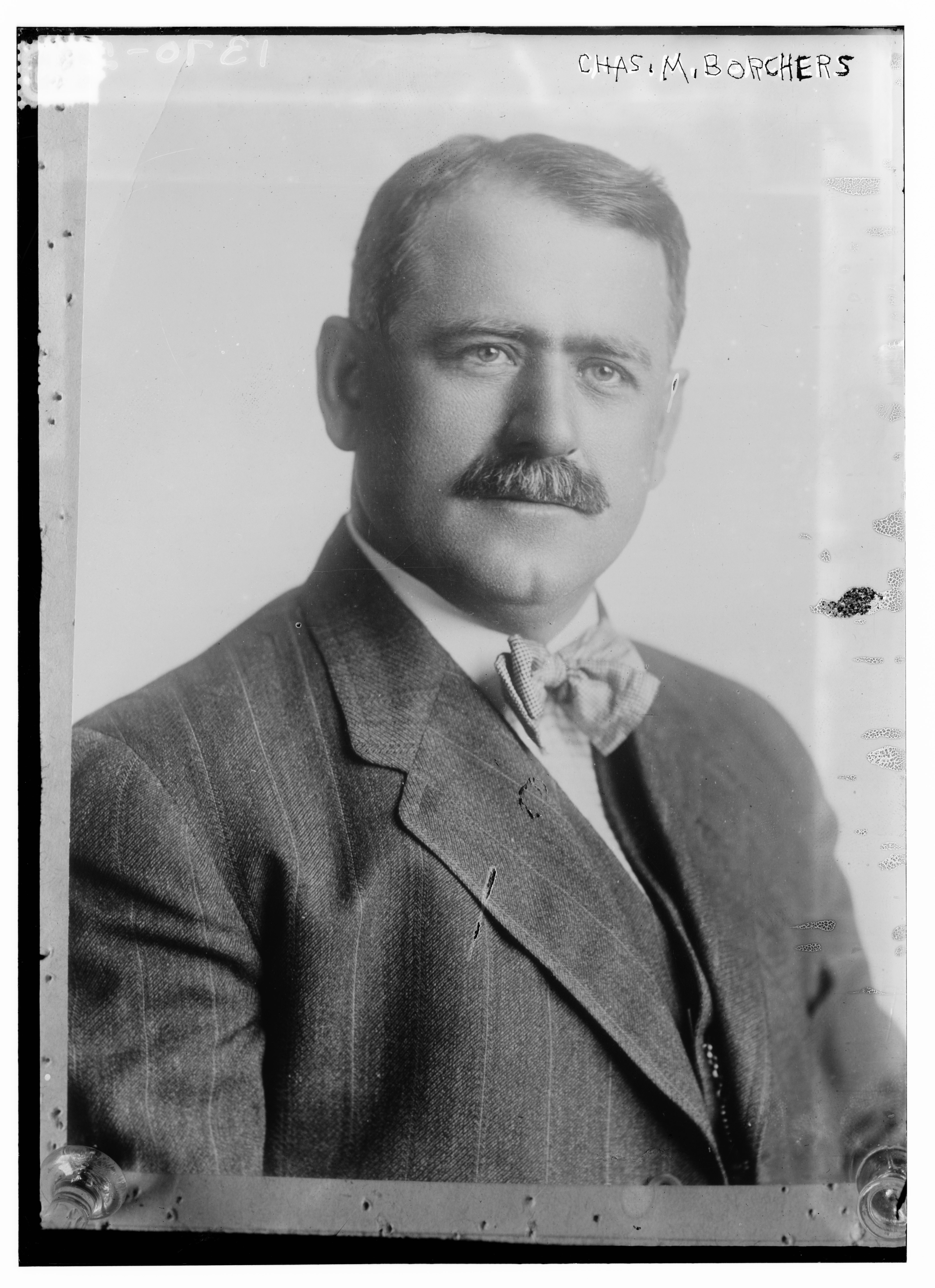
- Borchers in 1900

Member of the U.S. House of Representatives from Illinois's 19th district
- In office March 4, 1913 – March 3, 1915
- Preceded by: William B. McKinley
- Succeeded by: William B. McKinley

Mayor of Decatur, Illinois
- In office 1919–1923
- Preceded by: Dan Dinneen
- Succeeded by: Elmer R. Elder
- In office 1909–1911
- Preceded by: E.S. McDonald
- Succeeded by: Dan Dinneen

Personal details
- Born: Charles Martin Borchers; November 18, 1869 Lockville, Ohio
- Died: December 2, 1946 (aged 77) Decatur, Illinois
- Party: Democratic
- Spouse: Alice Bowman (m. 1905)
- Relatives: A. Webber Borchers (son)

Charles Martin Borchers (November 18, 1869 – December 2, 1946) was an attorney and politician who held office as a U.S. representative from Illinois (1913-1915) and as mayor of Decatur, Illinois, (1909–1911; 1919–1923). Borchers was a member of the Democratic Party.

== Early life, education, and career ==
Borchers was born in Lockville, Ohio, on November 18, 1869. He was the son of Frederick W. Borchers and Saluda Hummel Borchers. In 1875, Borchers moved to Illinois with his parents and settled in Macon County. He attended local common schools, and lived on his family's farm in Macon County until the age of 19. Borchers's family was poor, and he did not receive a formal advanced education. Instead, he self-taught with borrowed books to study for his teaching certificate, which he received in 1889.

Borchers taught school in Macon County for seven years. He taught first at Kirby School, and later at the Excelsior and White schools.

Borchers studied law in the offices of Albert G. Webber, and was admitted to the bar by exam in 1897. He commenced legal practice in Decatur, Illinois, first returning to Webber's office before opening his own practice one year later.

== Politics ==
Portrait, circa 1919

A lifelong Democrat, Borchers entered politics. He first held office as mayor of Decatur from 1909 to 1911, having defeated C.F. Shilling for the office by a 69-vote margin. In 1911 (there first election after the city switched to a city commission government), Borchers lost his campaign for re-election as mayor to Dan Dineen by an 81-vote margin.

In 1912, Borchers was elected as a Democratic member of the United States House of Representatives for the Sixty-third Congress (March 4, 1913 – March 3, 1915). He defeated incumbent congressman William B. McKinley by a margin of 1,523. While in congress, he was one of six selected to travel to inspect the newly-completed Panama Canal in 1913. He was an unsuccessful candidate for re-election in 1914 to the Sixty-fourth Congress. After leaving congress, he resumed the practice of law.

Borchers again served as mayor of Decatur 1919–1923. He ousted Dineen in the 1919 mayoral election, a re-match of the 1911 election. In his second tenure as mayor, Borchers supervised the construction of the Lake Decatur Dam. He also was involved in the installation of stormwater sewers. Borchers and Frank Torrence together oversaw the expansion and improvement of the city's parks. During his second mayoralty, the city bought additional land to expand Lincoln Park, bought the land of Dreamland Pond in Fairview Park, and bought the land for both Torrence Park and the Nelson Park Golf Course. Borchers was regarded to be an opponent of the local Ku Klux Klan, whom he condemned for lawlessness.

Borchers was an unsuccessful candidate in the Democratic primary of the 1924 Illinois gubernatorial election. Never being fond of public speaking, Borchers did very little to campaign. In 1930, Borchers ran to regain his former seat in the United States House of Representatives, but was heavily defeated by Charles Adkins. Borchers ran for public office one final time, running unsuccessfully for a seat on the Decatur Board of Education in 1935.

== Personal life and death ==
In 1905, Borchers married Alice Bowman of Oakley, Illinois.

Borchers died at St. Mary's Hospital in Decatur on December 2, 1946, after suffering a cerebral hemmorage. He was interred in West Frantz Cemetery in Oakley.

One of Borchers's sons, A. Webber Borchers, served as a state representative. Another son of Borchers, Robert M. Borchers, unsuccessfully ran for mayor of Decatur in 1959.

U.S. House of Representatives
Preceded by William B. McKinley	Member of the U.S. House of Representatives from Illinois's 19th congressional district 1913-1915	Succeeded by William B. McKinley
