= A. Webber Borchers =

American lawyer and politician

Albert Webber Borchers (July 1, 1906 – September 9, 1989) was an American lawyer and politician.

Borchers was born in Decatur, Illinois. Borchers graduated from University of Illinois in 1931 and was the university's second Chief Illiniwek. He served in the United States Army during World War II. Borchers was involved with property management in Decatur. He served on the Macon County Board from 1947 to 1958 and was a Republican. Borchers served in the Illinois House of Representatives from 1969 to 1975 and from 1979 to 1981. Borchers died at his home in Decatur, Illinois after breaking his hip.

Borchers was a son of Charles M. Borchers, who served as a congressman and mayor of Decatur.
