= William Querfeld =

American politician

William David Querfeld (October 28, 1877 – January 1, 1953) was an American businessman, farmer, and politician.

Querfel was born in DeWitt County, Illinois. A farmer and grain dealer, he was also in the farm-implement business. Living in Clinton, Illinois, he served as the township's highway commissioner and the county highway commissioner, and served on the district school board. A Republican, he served in the Illinois House of Representatives in 1941–1942. He died at the John Warner Hospital in Clinton, Illinois after suffering a stroke.
