= Santa Fe University of Art and Design =

For-profit art school in Santa Fe, New Mexico, US

Coordinates: 35.657°N 105.977°W

- Former names: St. Michael's College (1859–1966); College of Santa Fe (1966–2009)
- Type: Private for-profit art school
- Active: 1859 (St. Michael's College); 1966 (College of Santa Fe); 2009 (Santa Fe University of Art and Design); 1859–2018
- Affiliations: Laureate International Universities, the Lasallian Brothers
- President: Maria Puziferro
- Undergraduates: 950
- Location: Santa Fe, New Mexico, United States
- Campus: Urban
- Website: www.santafeuniversity.edu

Santa Fe University of Art and Design (SFUAD) was a private for-profit art school in Santa Fe, New Mexico. The university was built from the non-profit College of Santa Fe (CSF), a Catholic facility founded as St. Michael's College in 1859, and renamed the College of Santa Fe in 1966. After financial difficulties in 2009, the college closed and the campus was purchased by the City of Santa Fe, the State of New Mexico, and Laureate Education, and reopened with a narrowed focus on film, theater, graphic design, and fine arts. As Santa Fe University of Art and Design it became a secular college of 950 students. The university closed in May 2018 due to significant ongoing financial challenges.

== History ==
St. Michael's College was established at the behest of Archbishop Jean-Baptiste Lamy, who had arrived in New Mexico in 1851 to find that formal schooling in the territory was nonexistent. After establishing the Loretto Academy for girls in 1852, Lamy recruited the De La Salle Christian Brothers to open a similar school for boys, and St. Michael's held its first classes in the fall of 1859. In the 1870s, the school appointed a new leader, Brother Botulph, who oversaw its growth into an institution of higher learning. Under Botulph, St. Michael's began offering high school diplomas, and later, teaching certificates. In 1874 it received a charter from the territorial legislature, making it the oldest chartered college in New Mexico. In 1878, the school completed a new main building which still stands in altered form on Old Santa Fe Trail.

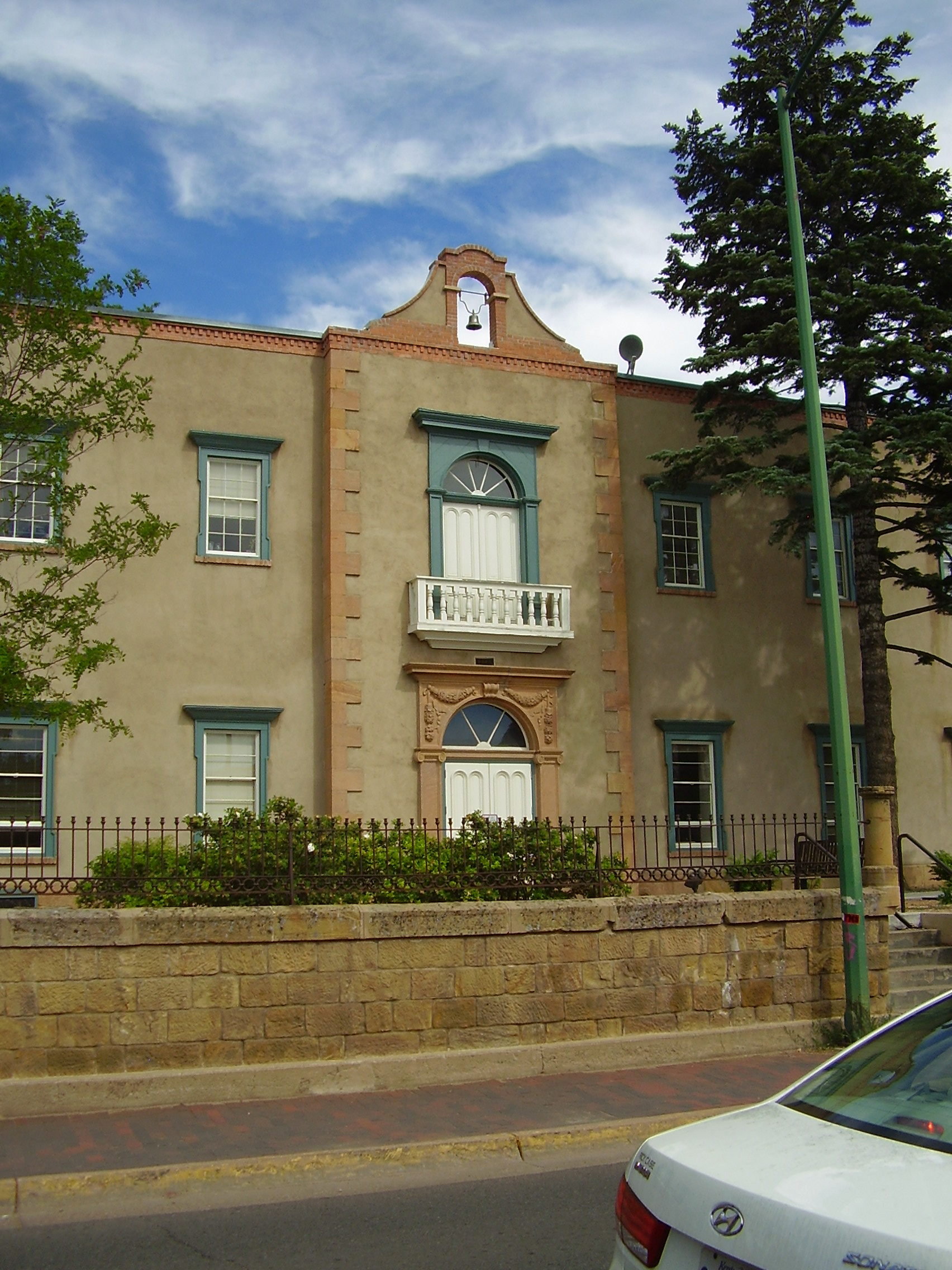
The 1878 Lamy Building originally housed St. Michael's College

Eventually, with different types of educational institutions becoming more sharply delineated, St. Michael's phased out its post-secondary courses by the end of World War I to operate strictly as St. Michael's High School. However, in the 1940s, the school's former principal Brother Benildus of Mary decided to re-establish St. Michael's College as an institution of higher learning. In 1944 he launched a fundraiser to build a new college on the existing campus which fell short of the goal. However, he got a second chance when the former Bruns Army General Hospital on Cerrillos Road was declared surplus property at the end of World War II. In 1947, Benildus managed to secure a portion of the hospital complex totaling 125 acres (51 ha) and 39 semi-permanent wooden buildings for the new college, which was ready to begin classes in the fall. By 1949 the college had over 200 students, and in 1961 it completed its first permanent building, Brother Benildus Hall.

In 1966, the Christian Brothers changed the name of the school to the College of Santa Fe.

In February 2009, the College of Santa Fe declared a state of financial emergency. Attempts to merge with Highlands University faltered due to funding concerns, and the school nearly closed. In September 2009, a public-private partnership that included the City of Santa Fe, the New Mexico State Governor's Office and Laureate Education (a for-profit corporation) purchased the campus, reopening the school as The College of Santa Fe, under different leadership.

The name changed to Santa Fe University of Art and Design on August 30, 2010 after the school decided to narrow its focus on art and design. There is no longer an affiliation with the Lasallian Brothers or the alumni of College of Santa Fe.

On May 18, 2016 the school announced that it would be acquired by Raffles Education, a Singapore-based private company. However, the deal fell through, leaving ownership of the school with Laureate Education. Citing "significant ongoing financial challenges," the university closed after the 2017-2018 school year.

== Campus ==
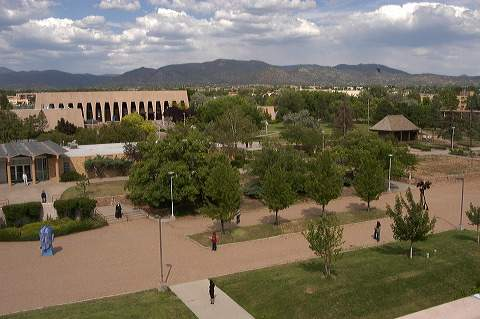
Campus with Fogelson Library Center

The Santa Fe University of Art and Design was housed on 60-acres. Approximately 70% of its student body lived in college-owned housing.

=== Facilities ===
The campus is the location of the Greer Garson Theatre Center, which includes the Weckesser Studio Theatre, a black-box performance space, a dance studio, the Claire Stewart Williamson Acting Lab, practice rooms and costume shops.

Visual Arts Center designed by Ricardo Legorreta

The Visual Arts Center houses the art and photography departments. The facility is a series of interconnected buildings designed by Ricardo Legorreta.

Garson Studios is a 27,000-square-foot motion picture soundstage facility connected to the university's Film School. It has the largest permanent green screen in the state of New Mexico. The facility was founded in 1989 by actress and College of Santa Fe patron Greer Garson. According to the school, Garson Studios has been the filming location of over 30 films, which collectively have been nominated for 20 Academy Awards, with 5 wins. Students from all programs are eligible to intern on films produced at Garson Studios.

The Screen is a cinematheque with seating for 165. It screens international, artistic, and independent films, and also streams performances of operas, ballets, and plays via satellite. The theater is open to the public.

== Post-closure redevelopment plans ==
In late November 2022 the Santa Fe Mayor and City Council approved a legislative package that would rezone the campus to mixed use and adopted a master plan that includes 1,100 housing units.

== Academics ==
Santa Fe University of Art and Design was accredited by the Higher Learning Commission.

The college offered degrees in arts management, contemporary music, creative writing, digital arts, film, graphic design, performing arts, photography, and studio art.

In 2012 the school began collaborating with actor Robert Redford to offer a full-ride Unique Voice scholarship for indigenous people, as well as several Emerging Artist Scholarships.

== Notable alumni ==
=== St. Michael's College ===
- Conrad Hilton, hotelier
- Octaviano Ambrosio Larrazolo, former Governor and U.S. Senator for New Mexico.
- Manuel Lujan Jr., former United States Secretary of the Interior, former member of the U.S. House of Representatives (Note: Source says Lujan graduated from the College of Santa Fe in 1950, which at that time was known as St. Michael's College)

=== College of Santa Fe ===
- Ari Aster, filmmaker
- Jeffrion L. Aubry, politician in New York
- Ray Buktenica, television actor
- Suzanna Choffel, American singer-songwriter and musician
- Paul Collins and Nick Petree of the band Beirut
- Samantha Crain, singer-songwriter/musician
- Rockmond Dunbar, actor
- William Jackson Harper, actor
- Tim Huelskamp, U.S. Representative from Kansas's 1st district.
- Annie Lederman, comedian
- Macklemore, a.k.a. Ben Haggerty, Grammy Award-winning rapper
- Alissa Moreno, singer-songwriter
- Roxy Paine, American sculptor
- Denise Poirier, voice actress for Aeon Flux
- Graham Robertson, filmmaker
- Debbie Rodella, New Mexico state legislator
- Paul Rogers, Academy-Award-winning film editor
- William Salyers, actor/voice actor
- Oliver M. Thomas, Jr., New Orleans Democratic city council member who pleaded guilty to bribery in 2007
- Michael Tyburski, filmmaker
- Bernadette Vigil, muralist

== Notable faculty ==
- Matt Donovan, Chair, Creative Writing and Literature. Recipient of the 2010 Whiting Writers’ Award.
- Chris Eyre, Chair, The Film School. Recipient of Peabody and Emmy awards for his work as a filmmaker.
- Jon Jory, President's Chair, Performing Arts Department. Member of the American Theatre Hall of Fame; recipient of the National Theatre Conference Award and the American Theatre Association's Distinguished Career Award.
- Tony O'Brien, Chair, Marion Center of Photographic Arts. Photojournalist. In 1990, O'Brien won the first Eliot Porter Foundation Grant.
- Anne Valente, Creative Writing and Literature. Recipient of the 2011 Dzanc Books Short Story Prize
- Susan York, Installation art and Ceramics. Sculptor.
- Horace Alexander Young, Chair, Contemporary Music Program. saxophonist and flute player
