= Nicholas L. Hubbard =

American politician, farmer, and businessman

Hubbard, circa 1935

Nicholas L. Hubbard (May 8, 1895 – January 4, 1983) was an American politician, farmer, and businessman.

== Early life ==
Hubbard was born in Mount Pulaski, Illinois. He went to the Mount Pulaski Public Schools and graduated from Illinois State University.

== Career ==
Hubbard served in the United States Army during World War I and was commissioned a second lieutenant. He taught school in Mount Pulaski and was a farmer. He was involved with the grain elevator business and was the owner of the Mount Pulaski Grain Company. Hubbard served in the Illinois House of Representatives from 1935 to 1941 and in the Illinois Senate from 1941 to 1945. Hubbard was a Democrat. Hubbard died at the Abraham Lincoln Hospital in Lincoln, Illinois.
