= Robert Roche (activist) =

American activist (born 1947)

- Born: May 3, 1947 (age 79); Cleveland, Ohio, United States
- Citizenship: American
- Occupation: Civil rights organizer
- Years active: 1973–present
- Organization(s): The American Indian Education Center; People, Not Mascots; Autonomous American Indian Movement (AAIM)
- Known for: Chairman and Executive Director of the American Indian Education Center of Cleveland (now run by Jeffrey Pierce); Opposition to Chief Wahoo and other Native American mascots

Robert Roche, also known as Bob Roche and Rob Roche, is an activist for Native American civil rights. He is perhaps best known for being one of several prominent American Indians to spearhead the movement against the use of Native American imagery as sports mascots.

== Early life ==
Robert Roche was born Robert Joseph Roche on 3 May 1947 at Saint Ann's Hospital located in Cleveland, Ohio. He would end up meeting Russell Means, a well-known actor, civil rights activist and founder of the Cleveland branch of the American Indian Movement. He would profoundly influence a young Roche, and the two would go on to collaborate on many projects.

== Career ==
From 1974 to 1984, Roche worked in the City of Cleveland Juvenile Court Division as an Acting Probation Officer. During this time, he worked with indigenous youth who had come in contact with and were already in the juvenile justice system. In 1995, Robert Roche founded the American Indian Education Center, a non-profit organization that offered a variety of re-entry services for the American Indian population in the greater Greater Cleveland area, including HIV testing, tutoring, smoking cessation classes, cultural programming and resume writing instruction. in Cleveland, Ohio. Roche opened the American Indian Education Center to provide a more comprehensive variety of services after the two decades of controversy its "predecessor," the Cleveland American Indian Center, founded by Russell Means, had been embroiled in. in Cleveland, Ohio.
Robert currently serves as the executive director of the American Indian Education Center in Cleveland, Ohio. Some of the work he carried out was documented in a book written by attorney Joseph Patrick Meissner as part of a compendium of accounts focusing on people who work to improve their community. Robert Roche has also taught a course in Oberlin College's Experimental College Department about the history of the Native American civil rights organization, the American Indian Movement.

== Activism ==
Roche was an active member of the Cleveland branch of the Autonomous American Indian Movement (AAIM) until January 2020, a separate division of the American Indian Movement.

Robert Roche has been a highly visible figure on the Cleveland scene for many decades, periodically using his role as a leader in the community to act as a character witness. He provided testimony in the clemency hearing for Billy Slagle, who was convicted of aggravated murder with death penalty specifications after, in 1987, he stabbed babysitter Mari Anne Pope to death while the children she was babysitting watched. In the appeal, Roche explained that Slagle, whose mother was Native American, visited the American Indian Education Center with his family as a child. Roche recalled alcohol abuse and violence were prominent fixtures in Slagle's home and believed Slagle would have been incapable of murder if it were not his addictions.

Roche worked to raise awareness for Cleveland kidnapping victim Amanda Berry, who is part Native American, by writing letters to the city police department and holding candlelight vigils for her.

Roche engaged in annual protests against Cleveland Indians mascot Chief Wahoo since 1973. He also founded the group "People, Not Mascots", a cohort which is dedicated to raise awareness against the use of a race of people as mascots and end the current use of offensive Native American imagery. As he explained, "We are not mascots. I'm nobody's mascot. My children are not mascots. "It mocks us as a race of people. It mocks our religion." Roche's protest at the Indians' 2014 home opener went viral when local blogger Peter Pattakos, who had hoped to film an argument for an anti-Chief Wahoo documentary, instead staged a confrontation by goading Pedro Rodriguez, a Latino fan wearing red face paint and a fake feather headdress, into approaching Roche on camera.

On 25 June 2014, major news media outlets began reporting that Robert Roche would file a lawsuit against the Cleveland Indians organization in July. Roche would be suing the team in excess of $9 billion. According to Roche, compensation would be sought based on the length of time and exploitation which has occurred from the use of the mascot. "We're going to be asking for $9 billion and we're basing it on a hundred years of disparity, racism, exploitation and profiteering," Roche said. "It's been offensive since day one. We are not mascots. My children are not mascots. We are people."

== Criticism ==
Robert Roche has been the subject of criticism from some members within the Cleveland Native American community. Philip Joseph Yenyo protester, and member of the American Indian Movement of Ohio, claimed that Roche had constructed a false identity, claiming to have a birth certificate which reveals that Robert Roche was really Jose Roche. However, when asked to validate the nature of the injurious claims, Yenyo was unable to substantiate his accusations with material evidence. Roche has also been accused by members of the Native American community of using the Center as a platform for himself while failing to provide a consistent regimen of services. Roche was also asked by one of the founders of the original American Indian Movement to stop identifying himself as a member of the organization. According to Vernon Bellecourt, Robert Roche had never been an AIM representative in Ohio. "We have known for some time that he was invoking the name of AIM," Bellcourt said. "We feel if people are doing good work in our name, it's OK. But that is not the case with Roche. We received complaints about him from leaders of the Indian community, and that was enough to cause us to issue the letter." Despite identifying himself as a representative of the Autonomous America Indian Movement, Roche would also state that he was representative or executive director of Cleveland AIM, even doing so in a resume where he describes himself as an "appointed American Indian Movement executive director - Cleveland Ohio, 1994-present."

There have also questions raised about the use of grant funds allocated to the American Indian Education Center Roche operates. The Ohio Attorney General's Office launched an investigation into the use of the Center's finances following a 2013 anonymous complaint that alleged the American Indian Education Center mishandled the grant money it had been appropriated, and the fact Roche paid $153,00.00 in salary and benefits to himself that year, according to the tax filing. Closer examination to the available financial records, however, showed that Roche paid himself in relative proportion of grant funding allocated to the organization. In 2012, the American Indian Education Center received $650,000.00 in grant funding, an elevated increase in comparison from previous years. This was due largely to a Department of Education grant aimed at improving education for impoverished and underprivileged kids. In 2011, when the center was allocated $235,000.00 in grant funding, Roche paid himself only $37,000.00. Prior to that year, in 2010, when the Center was allocated $42,000.00 in grants, Roche, who served as the executive director, and the sole full-time employee on staff (who also worked seven days a week), paid himself only $12,000.00. During that same year, he also wrote a $16,000.00 loan for the center. On the tax filing, under "purpose," it read: "Keep Center Open."

New details into the mismanagement of money allocated to the American Indian Education Center have slowly emerged. It was revealed that the inspector general for the U.S. Department of Health and Human Services also launched an independent investigation into the American Indian Education Center. According to the Substance Abuse and Mental Health Services Administration (SAMHSA) starting in 2011. The Substance Abuse and Mental Health Services Administration, which is a branch of the U.S. Department of Health, had provided thousands of dollars to the American Indian Education Center from 2011 onwards. However, due to the placement of a "high risk restriction" on the Center, access to the SAMHSA grant money was on a limited basis. The investigation also cites the lack of proper financial management to administer the federal grant. The probe has also identified certain irregularities into the expenditure of funds provided by the SAMHSA. These irregularities included the $136,000.00 salary Roche paid himself in 2012, which did not appear to be concordant with wages supplied in grant documentation provided by the American Indian Education Center, the flat fees paid to the center's grant writer, McGuire & Associates, are inconsistent with standard practice, and the Center's bylaws giving Roche governing authority and control over his board of directors, are not in keeping with federal guidelines, which state that the board should operate independently of its director. There are also matters of personnel costs, related taxes and fringe benefit payments that The Substance Abuse and Mental Health Services Administration is looking into.

One grant received by the American Indian Education Center received in 2012 carried over into 2013. However, the grant was terminated by the grantor, the Ohio Department of Education, which decided that the program being funded by the grant was ineffective. Roche also made an attempt to open a second education center for American Indian people in the city of Columbus, Ohio in spite of financial difficulties faced during 2012. Although he cited poor health and financial difficulties, Roche registered a 1989 Jaguar in the "unfinished" Columbus Center's name in December 2012. According to Roche, he donated the car to the center, where he plans to raffle the vehicle in the name of American Indian services.

=== Embezzlement ===
Prior to his August 2018 indictment, Roche had been under investigation from the Department of Health and Human Services for several years. Investigators found Roche to have conspired with consultant Craig McGuire, whose company wrote grant applications, to steal the Circle of Care grant money. In April 2017, McGuire had pled guilty to conspiracy and theft of government funds.

Investigators said Roche worked with consultant Craig McGuire to steal Circle of Care grant money. According to Roche's indictment, the two secured grants meant to support the mental health and wellness programs for American Indian and Alaskan families and children. McGuire, whose company wrote grant applications, pleaded guilty in April 2017 to conspiracy and theft of government funds.

Roche and consultant Craig McGuire conspired to divert money from the American Indian Education Center. Investigators say McGuire submitted false applications to the federal Substance Abuse and Mental Health Services Administration (SAMHSA). According to prosecutors, McGuire falsely claimed that the center offered an afterschool program for 500 children and had a "wellness department".

On 16 May 2018, Cleveland.com reported that Roche pled guilty to two counts of theft of government funds for stealing $77,000 in federal grant money meant from the Substance Abuse and Mental Health Services Administration grant money to improve the well-being of American Indians and Alaskan Natives living in Northeast Ohio. Roche was sentenced with four months in prison followed by four months of home confinement. Roche was also ordered by the judge to pay $77,000 in restitution, the amount he was accused of stealing.

Roche claimed he was in the early stages of dementia.

== See also ==
- American Indian Movement
- Chief Wahoo
- Native American mascot controversy
- Philip Joseph Yenyo
- Sundance
