= Philip Yenyo =

Native American civil rights activist

- Born: Cleveland, Ohio US
- Occupations: Executive Director of the American Indian Movement of Ohio chapter Activist
- Years active: 1993–7 April 2021
- Organization(s): American Indian Movement; Committee of 500 Years of Dignity and Resistance
- Website: American Indian Movement of Ohio

Philip Yenyo is a Native American civil rights activist. He is one of several prominent activists to spearhead the movement against the use of Native American imagery as sports mascots.

== Activism ==
Yenyo is the Executive Director of the American Indian Movement of Ohio (Ohio AIM). He is a member, former Co-Chair and Advisor for The Committee of 500 Years of Dignity and Resistance. He is also a former Outside advisor for the Native American Student Association at Kent State University and Baldin Wallace College. He is also a Member of the Lake Erie Native American Council aka LENAC. The latter organization serves as an indigenous-supportive, multicultural organization dedicated to bolstering the cultural human heritage rights of indigenous people who live in the Northeast Ohio region.

Yenyo has dedicated a significant portion of resources to protesting the use of Chief Wahoo mascot by the Cleveland Indians. "I would like to see the name and logo changed. Both have to go." Of the logo, Yenyo has stated, "But I think our people and others have come to realize that this caricature of our people as a red-face, smiling savage does great harm to us and our culture and has done so for many years." "This imagery, most sports teams are named after animals and they put us in that same category. We're human beings. We're still a living culture and we still exist." He has also explicated on the exploitation of other items of sacred significance to American Indian. "When we tell people that the feather is sacred to us, it's a sacred as a Christian cross, some of them start to come around and start understanding," he said. "When you start to explain to people how it affects us as a people and it puts us in a category with animals, they begin to see our side."

== Personal life ==
He is of Mexica descent.

== See also ==
- Robert Roche
- Sundance
