= Olmsted Falls, Ohio =

- City
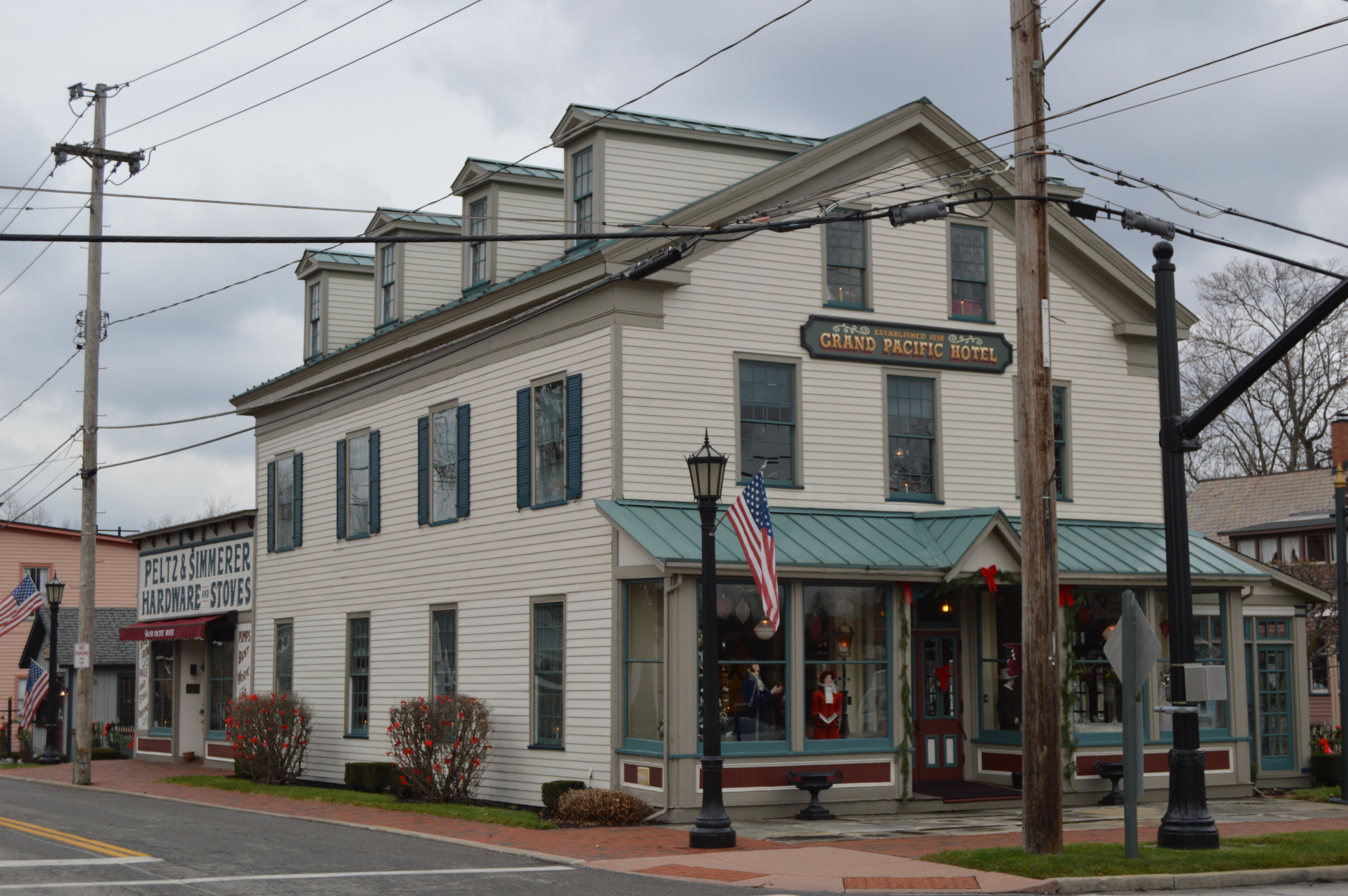
- Grand Pacific Hotel
- Interactive map of Olmsted Falls, Ohio
- Location within Ohio Location within the United States
- Coordinates: 41°22′3″N 81°54′17″W
- Country: United States
- State: Ohio
- County: Cuyahoga

Government
  - Mayor: James Patrick Graven

Area
  - Total: 4.08 sq mi (10.57 km^{2})
  - Land: 4.08 sq mi (10.57 km^{2})
  - Water: 0 sq mi (0.00 km^{2})
- Elevation: 774 ft (236 m)

Population (2020)
  - Total: 8,582
  - Density: 2,103/sq mi (811.9/km^{2})
- Time zone: UTC-5 (Eastern (EST))
  - Summer (DST): UTC-4 (EDT)
- ZIP codes: 44138
- Area code: 440
- FIPS code: 39-58422
- GNIS feature ID: 1072238
- Website: Official website

Olmsted Falls is a city in Cuyahoga County, Ohio, United States. The population was 8,582 at the 2020 census. A southwestern suburb of Cleveland, it is part of the Cleveland metropolitan area. The city's main business district is located at the corners of Bagley and Columbia Roads and contains the Grand Pacific Junction, a historic district.

== History ==
After the Revolutionary War, the area that later became Olmsted Township, from which Olmsted Falls (as well as most of North Olmsted) was subsequently created, was part of the Western Reserve, a strip of northeastern Ohio land stretching 120 miles west from the Pennsylvania border, that was claimed by Connecticut. In 1795, Connecticut sold most of that land to the Connecticut Land Company, which then divided it into townships and sold it by auction. Several bidders won the right to purchase what then was known as Township 6, Range 15, with the largest share of almost half of the township going to Aaron Olmsted, a sea captain from East Hartford, Connecticut. However, it took years for the sales to be consummated. Olmsted died in 1806, so when the sale of his land was completed in 1807, it went to his widow and three sons, who sold parts of the land to settlers.

Although James Geer, who then lived in Columbia Township to the south, planted a crop of corn across the border in 1814, it was 1815 when he and his family moved into a small log house in Township 6, Range 15, to become the township’s first settlers in a section that later became part of Olmsted Falls. The township had several informal names, including Kingston, until 1823, when it was organized as a civil township called Lenox. However, because of confusion with another Lenox Township in Ashtabula County, one resident suggested renaming it Olmsted Township in honor of Aaron Olmsted. Olmsted’s son, Charles Hyde Olmsted, not only agreed to the request but was so pleased that he offered to send the community about 500 books from Connecticut by oxcart. Those books became known as the Oxcart Library.

On April 7, 1856, Olmsted Falls was incorporated as a village from a portion of Olmsted Township. In 1857, the village doubled in size when it annexed Plum Creek, the unincorporated hamlet to the north. Olmsted Falls subsequently annexed other parts of Olmsted Township over the years. In 1970, voters in Olmsted Falls and Westview (also known as West View) voted to merge their two villages, which were roughly the same size, under the name Olmsted Falls. The merger became effective at the beginning of 1971. In 1972, the state recognized Olmsted Falls as Ohio’s 231st city because it had a population of more than 5,000 people. The city is governed by a charter with a mayor and council elected on a non-partisan basis.

Two railroads run through Olmsted Falls. CSX tracks, originally built in 1849, cross northeast-southwest through the southeastern corner of the city. Norfolk Southern tracks, originally built in 1853, cut east-west through the city.

Olmsted Falls is part of the Olmsted Falls City School District, which also includes Olmsted Township and parts of Berea and Columbia Township.

Vitamix has its world headquarters in Olmsted Township right on the border with Olmsted Falls.

== Geography ==
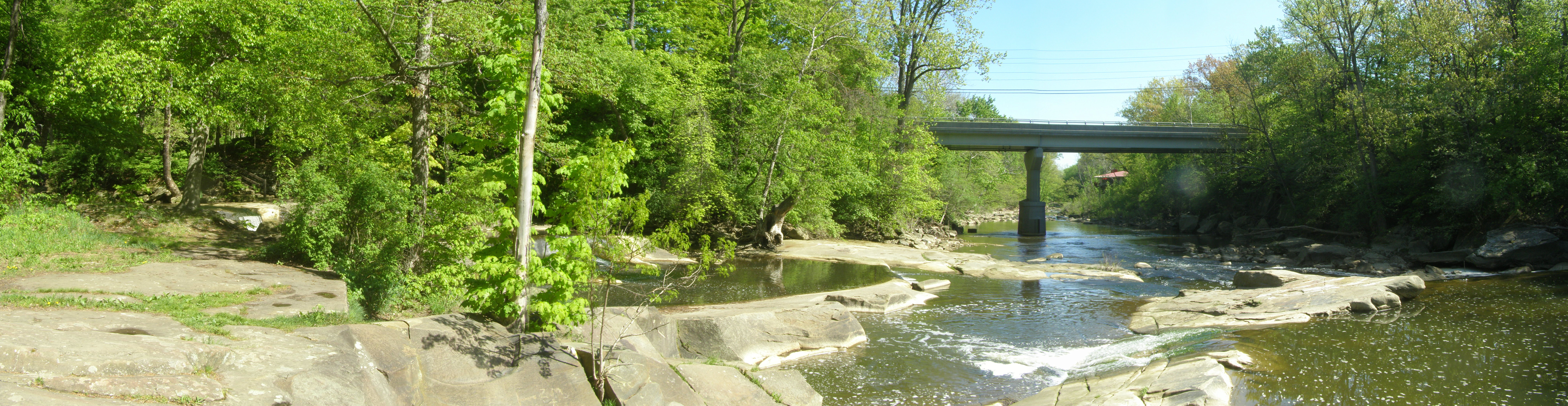
Rocky River below the falls in Olmsted Falls

Olmsted Falls is located at 41°22′3″N 81°54′17″W (41.367626, -81.904818). According to the United States Census Bureau, the city has a total area of 4.12 square miles (10.67 km^{2}), all land.

== Demographics ==
Historical population
Census	Pop.	Note	%±
1870	383		—
1880	404		5.5%
1890	342		−15.3%
1900	330		−3.5%
1910	394		19.4%
1920	374		−5.1%
1930	673		79.9%
1940	754		12.0%
1950	1,137		50.8%
1960	2,144		88.6%
1970	2,504		16.8%
1980	5,868		134.3%
1990	6,741		14.9%
2000	7,962		18.1%
2010	9,024		13.3%
2020	8,582		−4.9%
2025 (est.)	8,669		1.0%

=== Racial and ethnic composition ===
Olmsted Falls city, Ohio – Racial and ethnic composition Note: the US Census treats Hispanic/Latino as an ethnic category. This table excludes Latinos from the racial categories and assigns them to a separate category. Hispanics/Latinos may be of any race.
Race / Ethnicity (NH = Non-Hispanic)	Pop 2000	Pop 2010	Pop 2020	% 2000	% 2010	% 2020
White alone (NH)	7,631	8,405	7,631	95.84%	93.14%	88.92%
Black or African American alone (NH)	95	171	159	1.19%	1.89%	1.85%
Native American or Alaska Native alone (NH)	3	3	4	0.04%	0.03%	0.05%
Asian alone (NH)	55	109	119	0.69%	1.21%	1.39%
Native Hawaiian or Pacific Islander alone (NH)	2	0	0	0.03%	0.00%	0.00%
Other race alone (NH)	2	10	30	0.03%	0.11%	0.35%
Mixed race or Multiracial (NH)	54	95	326	0.68%	1.05%	3.80%
Hispanic or Latino (any race)	120	231	313	1.51%	2.56%	3.65%
Total	7,962	9,024	8,582	100.00%	100.00%	100.00%

=== 2020 census ===
As of the 2020 census, Olmsted Falls had a population of 8,582. The median age was 44.7 years. 19.8% of residents were under the age of 18 and 21.1% of residents were 65 years of age or older. For every 100 females there were 89.8 males, and for every 100 females age 18 and over there were 85.3 males age 18 and over. 100.0% of residents lived in urban areas, while 0.0% lived in rural areas. There were 3,666 households in Olmsted Falls, of which 27.0% had children under the age of 18 living in them. Of all households, 49.3% were married-couple households, 15.4% were households with a male householder and no spouse or partner present, and 29.5% were households with a female householder and no spouse or partner present. About 29.8% of all households were made up of individuals and 13.7% had someone living alone who was 65 years of age or older. There were 3,823 housing units, of which 4.1% were vacant. The homeowner vacancy rate was 1.2% and the rental vacancy rate was 4.9%.

Racial composition as of the 2020 census
Race	Number	Percent
White	7,733	90.1%
Black or African American	163	1.9%
American Indian and Alaska Native	5	0.1%
Asian	120	1.4%
Native Hawaiian and Other Pacific Islander	0	0.0%
Some other race	79	0.9%
Two or more races	482	5.6%
Hispanic or Latino (of any race)	313	3.6%

=== 2010 census ===
As of the census of 2010, there were 9,024 people, 3,684 households, and 2,431 families residing in the city. The population density was 2,190.3 inhabitants per square mile (845.7/km^{2}). There were 3,897 housing units at an average density of 945.9 per square mile (365.2/km^{2}). The racial makeup of the city was 94.9% White, 2.0% African American, 0.1% Native American, 1.2% Asian, 0.4% from other races, and 1.3% from two or more races. Hispanic or Latino of any race were 2.6% of the population.

There were 3,684 households, of which 32.6% had children under the age of 18 living with them, 52.5% were married couples living together, 11.0% had a female householder with no husband present, 2.6% had a male householder with no wife present, and 34.0% were non-families. 28.8% of all households were made up of individuals, and 9.4% had someone living alone who was 65 years of age or older. The average household size was 2.42 and the average family size was 3.01.

The median age in the city was 41.6 years. 24.5% of residents were under the age of 18; 6.7% were between the ages of 18 and 24; 24.1% were from 25 to 44; 31% were from 45 to 64; and 13.7% were 65 years of age or older. The gender makeup of the city was 46.7% male and 53.3% female.

=== 2000 census ===
As of the census of 2000, there were 7,962 people, 3,121 households, and 2,228 families residing in the city. The population density was 1,927.2 inhabitants per square mile (744.1/km^{2}). There were 3,267 housing units at an average density of 790.8 per square mile (305.3/km^{2}). The racial makeup of the city was 96.71% White, 1.31% African American, 0.99% Native American, 0.73% Asian, 0.06% Pacific Islander, 0.28% from other races, and 0.88% from two or more races. Hispanic or Latino of any race were 1.51% of the population.

There were 3,121 households, out of which 34.4% had children under the age of 18 living with them, 60.2% were married couples living together, 8.7% had a female householder with no husband present, and 28.6% were non-families. 24.8% of all households were made up of individuals, and 6.9% had someone living alone who was 65 years of age or older. The average household size was 2.54 and the average family size was 3.06.

In the city the population was spread out, with 26.6% under the age of 18, 6.2% from 18 to 24, 32.4% from 25 to 44, 24.9% from 45 to 64, and 9.9% who were 65 years of age or older. The median age was 37 years. For every 100 females, there were 92.8 males. For every 100 females age 18 and over, there were 89.2 males.

The median income for a household in the city was $57,826, and the median income for a family was $66,196. Males had a median income of $41,996 versus $35,110 for females. The per capita income for the city was $25,716. About 1.2% of families and 2.1% of the population were below the poverty line, including 1.2% of those under age 18 and 4.5% of those age 65 or over.

== Government ==
Olmsted Falls has a mayor–council government, where the mayor is an elected, ceremonial position. Chad Gluss was elected mayor in 2025. The Mayor's Court of Olmsted Falls is located in the City Hall building. The city council consists of seven members elected to two year terms, including a council president, president pro-tempore, council-at-large, clerk of council, and four ward representatives.

== Education ==
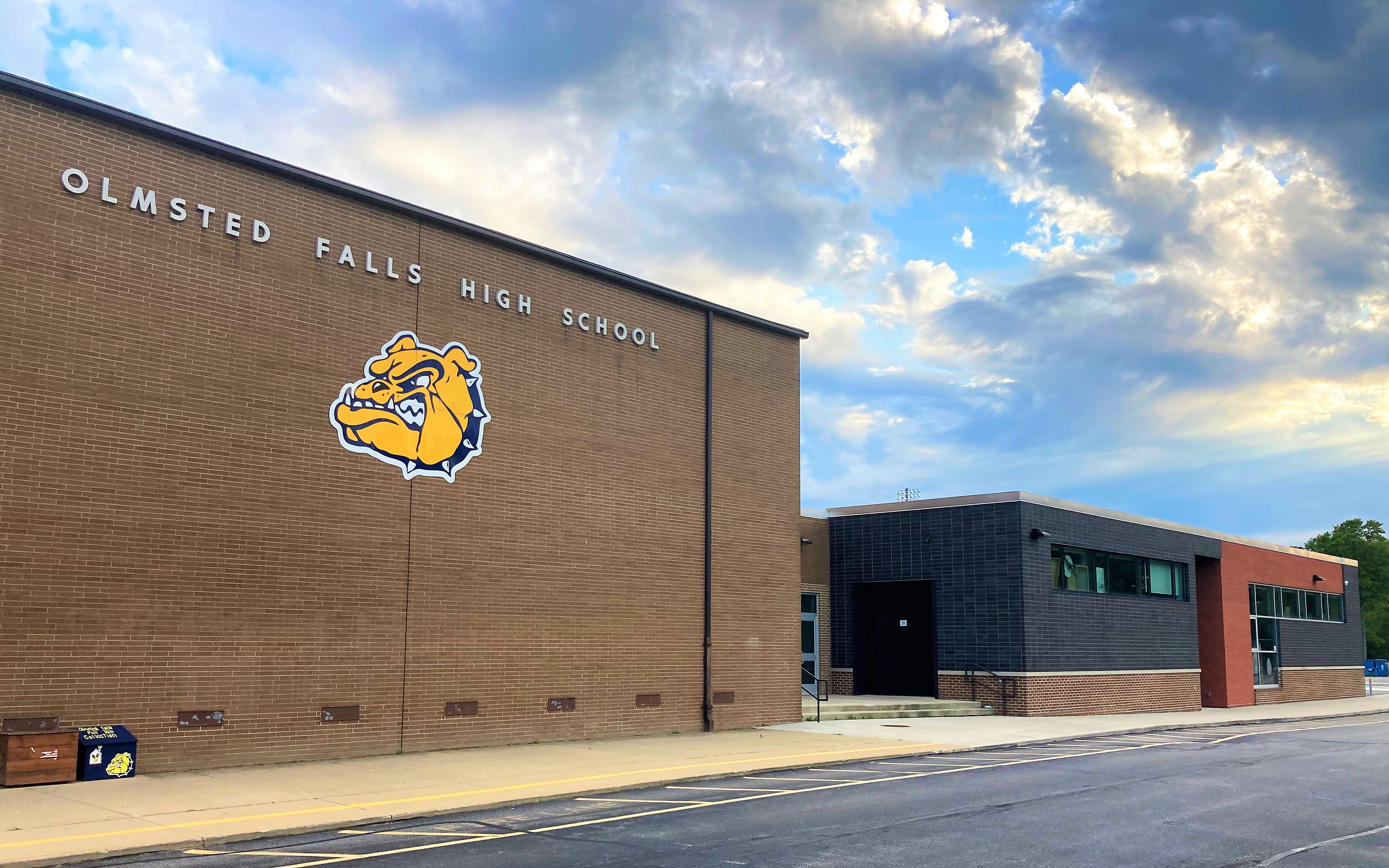
Olmsted Falls High School

Olmsted Falls is served by the public Olmsted Falls City School District. There are five schools in the school system; Early Childhood Center, Falls-Lenox Primary School, Olmsted Falls Intermediate School, Olmsted Falls Middle School, and Olmsted Falls High School.

== Notable people ==
- Stetson Allie, Major League Baseball pitcher and outfielder
- Mamie Colvin, temperance activist
- Mike Gansey, professional basketball executive and former player who is currently the general manager for the Cleveland Cavaliers of the National Basketball Association
- Steve Gansey, former basketball player and coach
- Norb Hecker, American football player and coach who was part of eight National Football League championship teams
- Lora Hirschberg, sound engineer
- Mickey Mental, head football coach at Weber State University
- Dan Monahan, actor
- Katie Moon, Olympic pole vaulting gold and silver medalist
- Jacy Sheldon, professional basketball player for the Connecticut Sun in the Women's National Basketball Association
- Philip Yenyo, Native American civil rights activist
- Sean Zawadzki, soccer player
