= Robert Roche =

Robert Roche may refer to:

- Robert Roche (businessman), American entrepreneur and philanthropist
- Robert Roche (activist), Native American civil rights activist
- Robert Roche (minister), Church of Scotland minister
- Robert H. Roche, American farmer and politician
