= Oberlin High School (Ohio) =

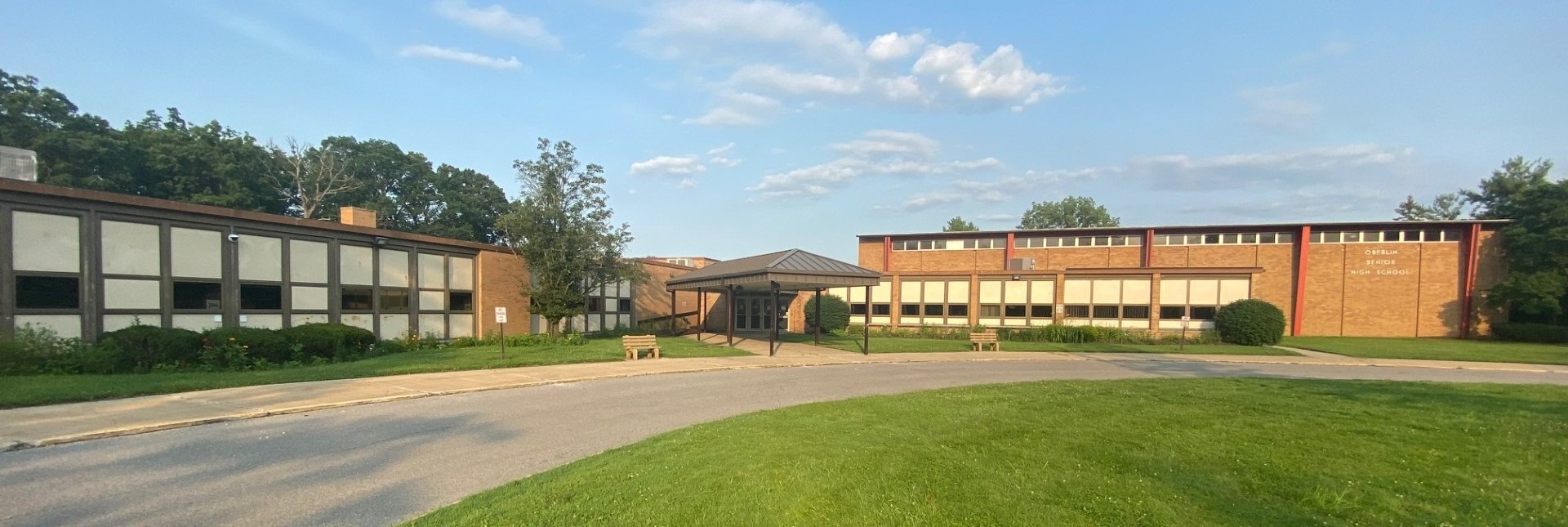

Location
- 281 North Pleasant Street; Oberlin, Ohio 44074; United States; 41°17′57″N 82°12′45″W

Information
- Type: Public
- Established: 1860
- School district: Oberlin City School District
- NCES School ID: 390445901471
- Principal: Chris Frank
- Teaching staff: 20.34 (FTE)
- Grades: 9–12
- Enrollment: 218 (2024–25)
- Student to teacher ratio: 10.72
- Colors: Red, white, and blue
- Athletics conference: Lorain County League
- Team name: Phoenix
- Rival: Wellington Dukes, Clearview Clippers
- Website: www.oberlinschools.net/our-schools/oberlin-high-school

Oberlin High School is a public high school in Oberlin, Ohio. It is the only high school in the Oberlin City School District.

== Academics ==
There is a partnership between the high school and Oberlin College. Students who live within the district and attend Oberlin High School for their entire high school career may attend Oberlin College tuition-free, if accepted.

== Athletics ==
The school is a member of the Lorain County League (LCL)

The school colors are red, white and blue. The mascot is now the Phoenix, after the school board voted to discontinue use of its former Native American mascot at the end of the 2006–07 school year. The school's fight song is the Iowa Fight Song. The school mascot used to be the Oberlin Indians with the logo depicted by a Native American with a feathered headdress. Sundance came across the high school's use of an offensive Native American mascot emblem. He decided to petition the local school board to convince the school to adapt another mascot, while opposition argued for the mascot's "insignificance". Several discussions took place before the final decision was rendered, and in 2007 the school decided to change its mascot and team name from the Oberlin Indians to the Oberlin Phoenix. This discussion was made with a fair amount of backlash.

=== State championships ===
- Football - 1899, 1900
- Boys basketball - 1926, 1986
- Boys track and field – 1932,1936

== Notable alumni ==
- Ross Gunn, scientist
- Charles Martin Hall, inventor of the Hall-Heroult process to extract aluminum from bauxite
- Robert Maynard Hutchins, influential American interdisciplinary educational philosopher
- David Lewis, philosopher
- Dwight Peabody, football player
- Jason Moore, football player
- Cliff Stoudt, former NFL Quarterback from 1977 to 1991, most notably with the Pittsburgh Steelers
- Hugh Thornton, football player
- Don Treadwell, head football coach at Miami University.
- Helen Hale Tuck, acting Dean of Women at Howard University, 1919 to 1922
