= Fighting Whites =

Intramural basketball team

University of Northern Colorado Fighting Whities intramural basketball team

The Fighting Whites (alternatively identified as Fightin' Whites, Fighting Whities, or Fightin' Whities) were an intramural basketball team formed at the University of Northern Colorado in 2002 and named in response to the Native American mascot controversy.

The intramural college team briefly attracted a storm of national attention because of its satirical protest about stereotypes of Native Americans being used as sports mascots, particularly the "Fightin' Reds" of Eaton High School in Eaton, Colorado, not far from the university in Greeley. The Reds' mascot has been described as "a caricature Indian with a misshapen nose, [wearing] a loincloth and eagle feather".

The intramural team, which included players of Native American, Caucasian, Latino, African American, and Middle Eastern ancestry, adopted the name "Fighting Whites", with an accompanying logo of a stereotypical "white man" in a suit, styled after advertising art of the 1950s, as their team mascot. The character has been described as a man from the Ozzie Nelson era or a "Father Knows Best white American male".

At first, the team's T-shirts used "Fightin' Whites" as the name of the team, but various media reports referred to the team as the "Whities" instead of "Whites". The team's popularity skyrocketed. In response to customer demand, the team eventually began selling shirts under both names. The team added the phrase "Fighting the use of Native American stereotypes" to its merchandise to discourage the shirts from being worn by white supremacists, and arranged for CafePress.com to handle manufacturing and sales of the clothing.

The team sold enough shirts that they were eventually able to endow a sizeable scholarship fund for Native American students at Northern Colorado. In 2003, the team donated $100,000 to the University of Northern Colorado's UNC Foundation, which included $79,000 designated for the "Fightin' Whites Minority Scholarship".
