= Olmsted Falls City School District =

Public school district in Ohio, United States

Address
- 26937 Bagley Road Olmsted Falls, Cuyahoga County, Ohio, 44138; United States
- Coordinates: 41.3722235°N 81.928687°W

District information
- Type: Public
- Grades: PreK–12
- Superintendent: James Lloyd
- School board: Olmsted Falls Board of Education
- Chair of the board: Holly Neumann
- Schools: 5
- NCES District ID: 3904657

Students and staff
- Students: 3,507 (2024–2025)
- Teachers: 186.01 (on an FTE basis) (2024–2025)
- Staff: 566.29 (on an FTE basis) (2024–2025)
- Student–teacher ratio: 18.85 (2024–2025)
- District mascot: Bulldogs
- Colors: Blue and Gold

Other information
- Website: www.ofcs.net

Olmsted Falls City School District is a public school district in Olmsted Falls, Ohio.

== Schools ==
The district includes the following schools:

- Olmsted Falls High School
- Olmsted Falls Middle School
- Olmsted Falls Intermediate School
- Falls-Lenox Primary School
- Early Childhood Center (preschool & kindergarten)
