= Olmsted Falls High School =

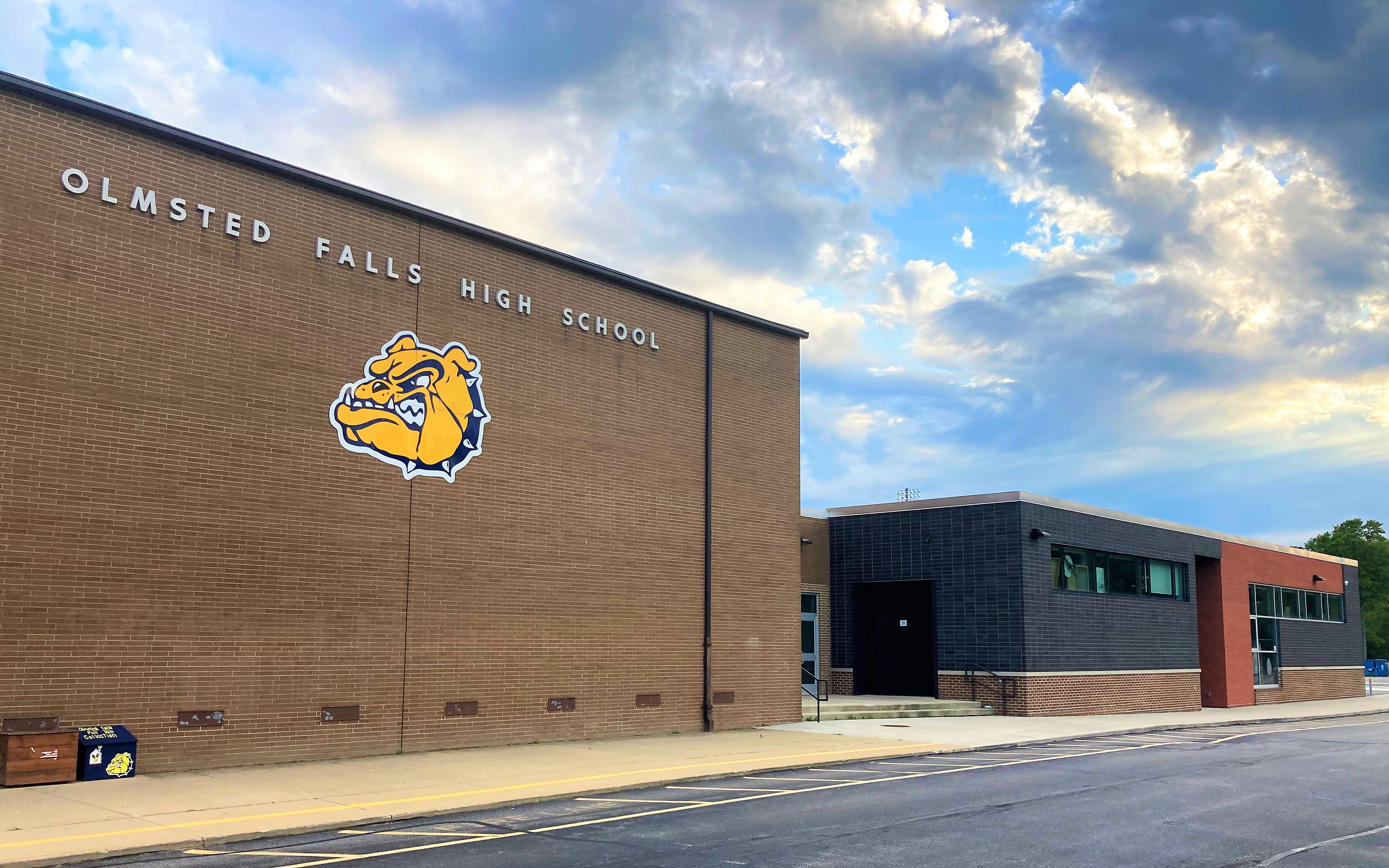

Location
- 26939 Bagley Road; Olmsted Falls, Ohio 44138; United States; 41°22′15″N 81°55′37″W

Information
- Type: Public high school
- Established: 1967
- School district: Olmsted Falls City School District
- Superintendent: James Lloyd
- Principal: Leo Spagnola
- Teaching staff: 59.50 (FTE)
- Grades: 9–12
- Enrollment: 1,228 (2024-2025)
- Student to teacher ratio: 20.64
- Campus: Suburban
- Colors: Navy Blue and Gold
- Athletics conference: Southwestern Conference
- Mascot: Bulldog
- Team name: Bulldogs
- Rival: North Olmsted High School, Berea-Midpark High School
- Newspaper: Spotlight
- Yearbook: Olmsted Falls Seniorio
- Website: Official website

Olmsted Falls High School is a public high school located in Olmsted Falls, Ohio, serving grades 9 through 12. Established in 1967, the school is part of the Olmsted Falls City School District and is a member of the Southwestern Conference. The school's colors are navy blue and gold, and its mascot is the Bulldog.

== Academics ==
Olmsted Falls High School offers a broad array of academic programs, including Advanced Placement (AP) courses, honors classes, and career-focused learning options. The school is recognized for its high standards of academic achievement and its commitment to student success.

== Athletics ==
Olmsted Falls High School has a rich tradition in athletics, with many state championships across various sports. The school’s athletic teams, known as the Bulldogs, compete in the Southwestern Conference (Ohio).

=== Ohio High School Athletic Association State Championships ===
- Football - 2000
- Boys' Lacrosse - 2023
- Girls' Cross Country - 1980, 1981, 1987
- Girls' Volleyball - 2008
- Girls' Basketball - 2024
- Girls' Pole Vault (Katie Nageotte) - 2009

== Notable alumni ==
- Dan Monahan (1973), actor
- Mike Gansey (2001), general manager for the Cleveland Cavaliers, played basketball overseas
- Steve Gansey (2004), basketball coach
- Katie Moon (2009), pole vaulter, Olympic gold medalist
- Jordan Fusco (2021), soccer player for the San Diego Wave
