= Grand Pacific Junction =

Historical district in Olmsted Falls, Ohio, US

Coordinates: 41°22′27″N 81°54′6″W

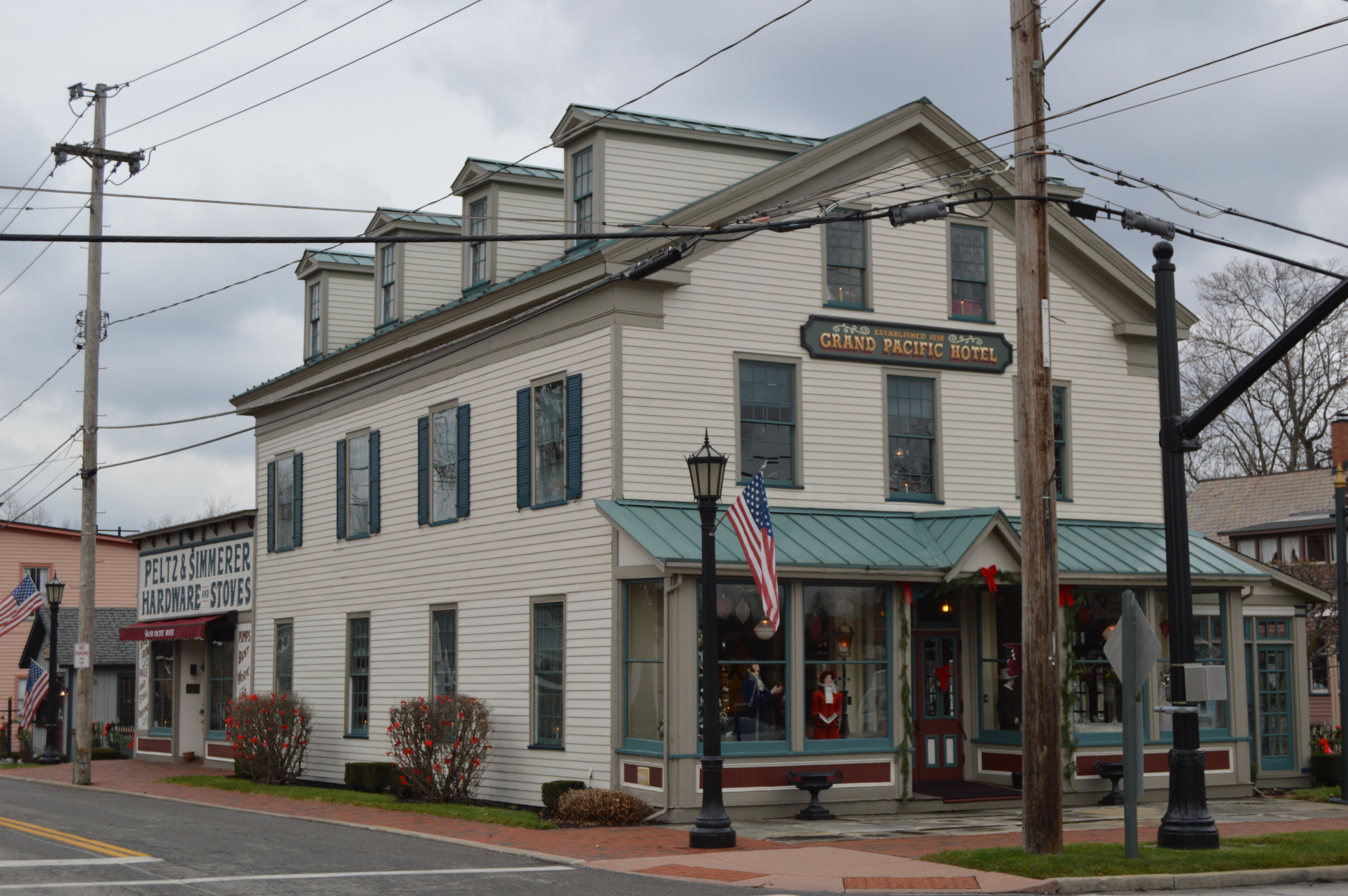
- Grand Pacific Hotel
- Interactive map of Grand Pacific Junction
- Location: 8082 Columbia Road, Olmsted Falls, Ohio, 44138

History
- Built: 1840

Site notes
- Area: Olmsted Falls, Ohio
- Restored: 1990-1993
- Restored by: Clint Williams
- Website: https://www.grandpacificjunction.com/

The Grand Pacific Junction is an historic district in Olmsted Falls, Ohio.

The district contains several buildings dating back to the mid-1800s, such as the Grand Pacific Hotel. The hotel and other buildings were renovated during the 1990s and are occupied today by retail establishments.

== History ==
The district contains about 30 buildings and storefronts today. A few of the oldest buildings are the jail house, built in 1860, and the Granary building, built in 1875. Both were renovated in the late 1900s and serve different uses today. The granary building used to be a storage and market for grain and feed

== Grand Pacific Hotel building ==
The Grand Pacific Hotel was erected in 1840. It served as a hotel until 1888 when Philip Simmerer bought it and turned it into a hardware store. it also housed a dentist's and doctor's office on the third floor. To make it easier for customers to access those offices without having to go through the store, a staircase was added on the south side of the building. It continued as a store until the 1970s.

The Grand Pacific Hotel was then owned by Bill Kucklick, and he renamed it Kucklick's Village Square Annex. On October 10, 1975, it was put on the National Register of Historic Places, and was known in the register for having Greek Revival-style architecture.

In 1989, Clint Williams, a realtor, bought the building and began restoring it, along with the rest of the Grand Pacific Junction. Williams removed the staircase on the south side of the building and added six dormers on the roof, two more on the south side and four on the north side. Inside the hotel, Williams added another room, changed the configuration of the windows and doors, and installed of a wooden bar in the rear of the building's interior. The renovations were completed in August 1992,

The Grand Pacific Hotel building now serves as a banquet room.

== Restoration of district ==
During the restoration of the other district buildings Williams added electrical, heat and air conditioning, and sewers. He also redid the windows, dormers and siding. Williams also built a gazebo built overlooking the creek He also moved a 1922 Vulcan locomotive and a caboose into the district. The train was then painted.

As of 2026 the district is home to assorted restaurants and shops.

== Heritage Days ==
The town of Olmsted Falls sponsors a four-day fair and parade each year in early August,
