= Dwight Peabody =

American football player (1894–1972)

No. 9
- Position: End

Personal information
- Born: January 26, 1894; Oberlin, Ohio, U.S.
- Died: January 3, 1972 (aged 77); Venice, Florida, U.S.
- Listed height: 5 ft 11 in (1.80 m)
- Listed weight: 170 lb (77 kg)

Career information
- High school: Oberlin (Ohio)
- College: Ohio State (1914–1917)

Career history
- Columbus Panhandles (1920); Toledo Maroons (1922)
- Stats at Pro Football Reference

Dwight Van Dorn Peabody (January 26, 1894 – January 3, 1972) was an American professional football end who played two seasons in the National Football League (NFL) with the Columbus Panhandles and Toledo Maroons. He played college football at Ohio State University.

== Early life and college ==
Dwight Van Dorn Peabody was born on January 26, 1894, in Oberlin, Ohio. He attended Oberlin High School in Oberlin.

He was a member of the Ohio State Buckeyes of Ohio State University from 1914 to 1917 and a three-year letterman from 1915 to 1917.

== Professional career ==
Peabody signed with the Columbus Panhandles of the American Professional Football Association (APFA) in 1920. He played in one game for the Panhandles during the APFA's first season in 1920. He was released in 1920.

Peabody was signed by the Toledo Maroons of the newly-renamed National Football League in 1922. He appeared in seven games, starting five, for the Maroons in 1922. He became a free agent after the season.

== Personal life ==
Peabody served in the United States Army. He was also a high school football coach in Indiana. He died on January 3, 1972, in Venice, Florida.
