= Mamie Colvin =

American temperance activist (1883–1955)

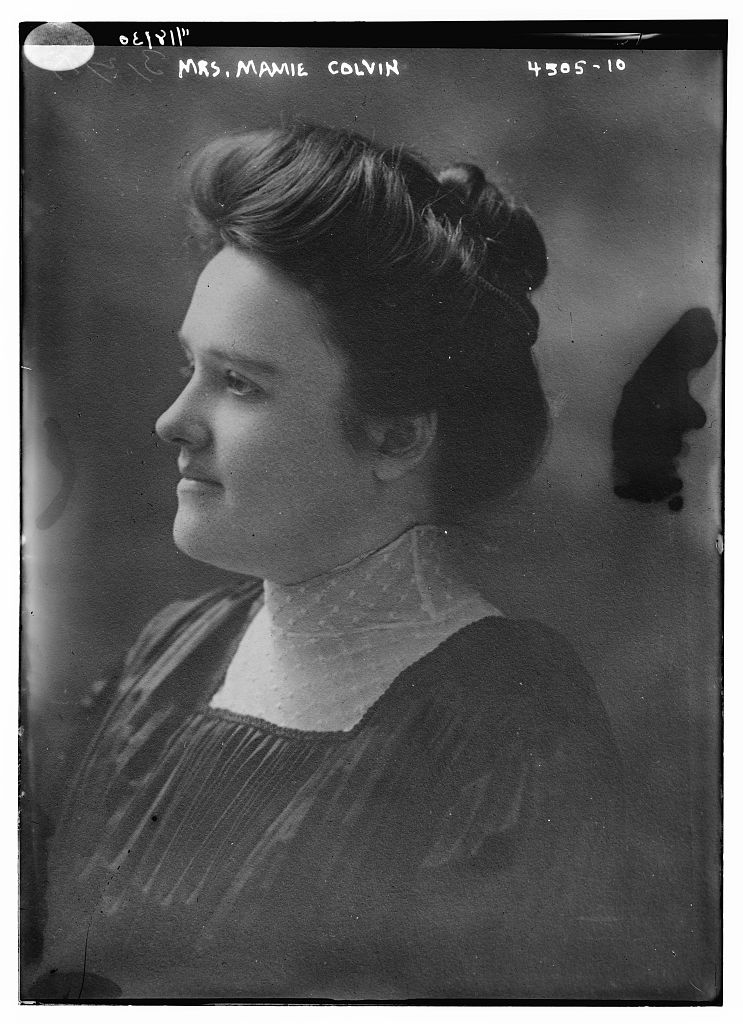
- Colvin in the 1910s.
- Born: Mamie White; June 12, 1883; Westview Village, Ohio
- Died: October 30, 1955 (aged 72); Clearwater, Florida
- Spouse: D. Leigh Colvin

Mamie White Colvin (June 12, 1883 – October 30, 1955) was an American temperance activist. In 1918, she was the Prohibition Party candidate for Lieutenant Governor of New York. She also ran as the Prohibition party candidate for U.S. representative from New York's 21st congressional district in 1921, making her the first woman to seek office at the congressional level in New York history. After failing to get elected into any political office, she went on to become president of the Women's Christian Temperance Union from 1944 until 1953.

== Early life ==
Colvin was born Mamie White on June 12, 1883, in Westview Village, Ohio, to Congregational minister Levi White, and his wife, Mary. While Colvin was a child, her mother was active in the Prohibition movement. Before she started High School, she followed her mother's footsteps and started giving speeches against alcohol. Her speeches lead her to win various contests for the Women's Christian Temperance Union. While attending Wheaton College, she won various honors for state and interstate public speaking contests until she graduated in June 1906. Following graduation, she attended graduate school at Columbia University, where she studied sociology. On September 19, 1906 She married fellow prohibitionist, and politician D. Leigh Colvin.

== Political career ==
In 1918, Colvin unsuccessfully ran for Lieutenant governor of New York, where she received 48,142 votes out of a total of 2.1 million cast. In 1921, she become the first woman to run for United States Congress in the state of New York when she represented the Prohibition Party for New York's 21st congressional district. She also did not win this race, but she received 382 out of the 23,928 votes.

== Later years ==
After failing to get elected in any public office, Colvin continued to advocate against alcohol consumption. From 1926 to 1944, Colvin was the president of the New York Women's Christian Temperance Union. In 1944, she became president of the organization at the national level, a position she held until 1953.

On October 30, 1955, Colvin was preparing to give a speech at the First Methodist Church in Clearwater, Florida when she collapsed from a heart attack and died.
