= Hugh Thornton (gridiron football) =

American football player (born 1991)

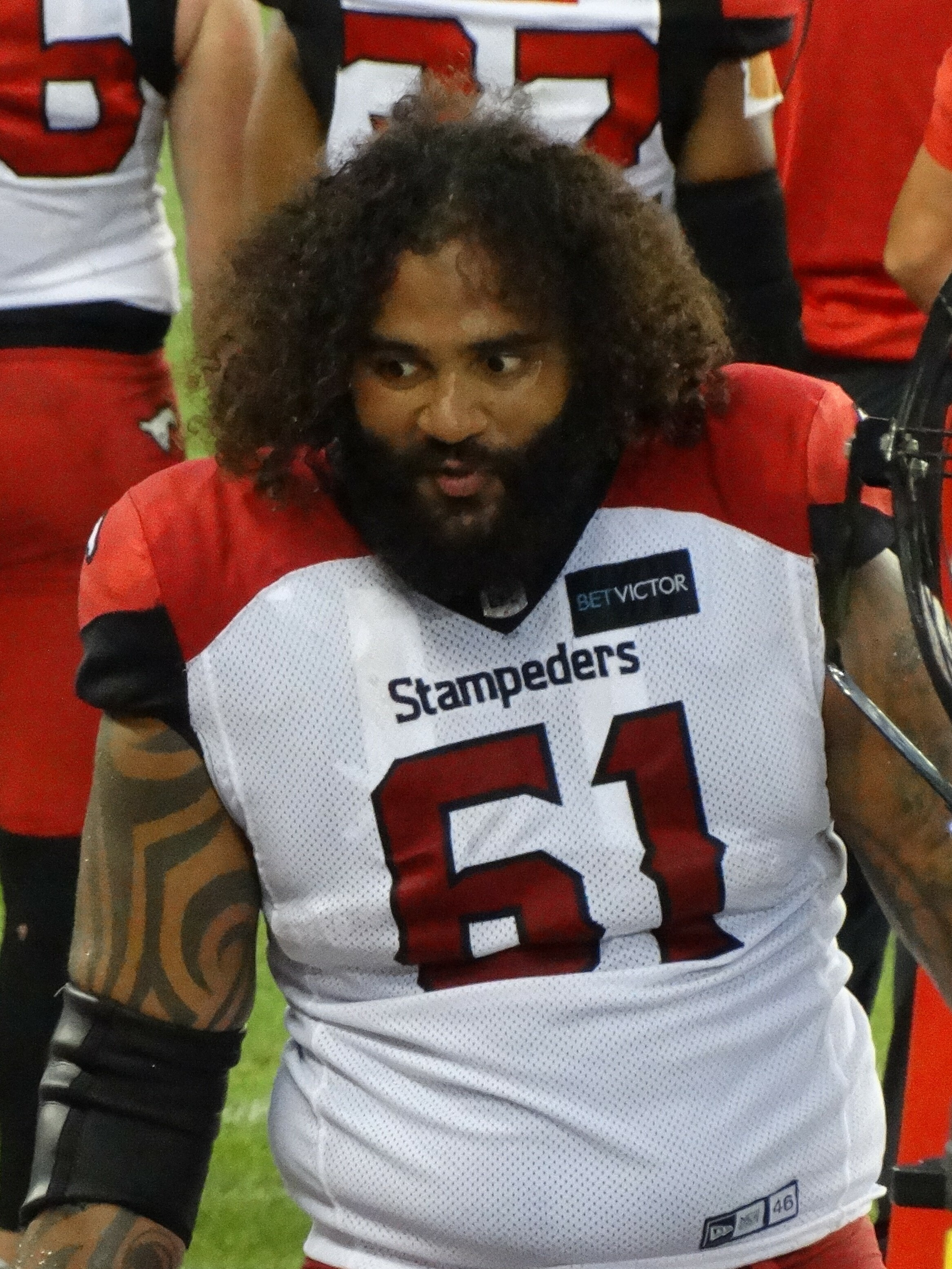
- Thornton with the Calgary Stampeders in 2022

Profile
- Position: Offensive tackle

Personal information
- Born: June 28, 1991 (age 35); Boise, Idaho, U.S.
- Listed height: 6 ft 3 in (1.91 m)
- Listed weight: 320 lb (145 kg)

Career information
- High school: Oberlin (OH)
- College: Illinois
- NFL draft: 2013: 3rd round, 86th overall pick

Career history
- Indianapolis Colts (2013–2016); Atlanta Falcons (2017)*; Arizona Hotshots (2019); Washington Redskins (2019)*; Calgary Stampeders (2022–2023)
- * Offseason or practice squad member only

Awards and highlights
- Second-team All-Big Ten (2012)

Career NFL statistics
- Games played: 37
- Games started: 32
- Stats at Pro Football Reference

Hugh Thornton (born June 28, 1991) is an American professional football offensive tackle. He played college football at Illinois, and was selected by the Indianapolis Colts in the third round of the 2013 NFL draft. Thornton has also been a member of the Atlanta Falcons, Arizona Hotshots, Washington Redskins and Calgary Stampeders.

== Early life ==
Thornton attended Oberlin High School in Oberlin, Ohio, and played for the Oberlin Phoenix high school football team. He also wrestled for the Oberlin HS wrestling team and in the 2008-2009 season placed third in Ohio at the OSHAA state tournament.

== College career ==
Thornton enrolled in the University of Illinois, where he played for the Illinois Fighting Illini football team from 2009 to 2012. Following his senior season in 2012, he was recognized as a second-team All-Big Ten Conference selection.

== Professional career ==
=== Indianapolis Colts ===
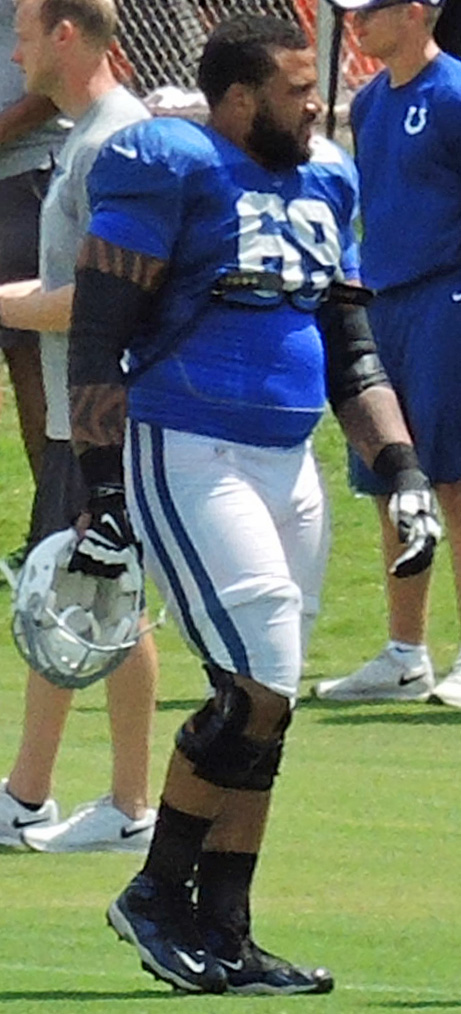
Thornton with the Colts in 2015

The Indianapolis Colts chose Thornton in the third round (86th overall) of the 2013 NFL draft. He began his rookie season as a backup to Mike McGlynn and Donald Thomas at offensive guard. However, he was made a starter after Thomas sustained a season ending quadriceps tear in a week two loss to the Miami Dolphins, and would go on to start 12 regular season games at left guard as a rookie, in addition to the two playoff games that the Colts played in that postseason. In 2014, Thornton appeared in 10 games, 8 as a starter.

On December 28, 2015, Thornton was placed on injured reserve. He played in 13 games in the 2015 season, 12 as a starter.

On September 3, 2016, Thornton was placed on injured reserve.

=== Atlanta Falcons ===
On March 21, 2017, Thornton signed with the Atlanta Falcons. On May 9, 2017, Thornton announced his retirement.

=== Arizona Hotshots ===
In 2019, Thornton came out of retirement and joined the Arizona Hotshots of the Alliance of American Football. He was placed on injured reserve on January 30, 2019. He was activated from injured reserve on March 13, 2019.

=== Washington Redskins ===
On July 31, 2019, Thornton signed with the Washington Redskins. He was waived on August 31, 2019.

=== Calgary Stampeders ===
On April 8, 2022, Thornton signed with the Calgary Stampeders of the Canadian Football League (CFL). He played in four games, all starts, for the Stampeders in 2022 and two games, all starts, in 2023. He spent time on injured reserve during both of his seasons in Calgary.

== Personal ==
When Thornton was twelve years old, his mother and sister were murdered by his mother's ex-boyfriend in his childhood home in Jamaica.
