= Helen Hale Tuck =

American educator

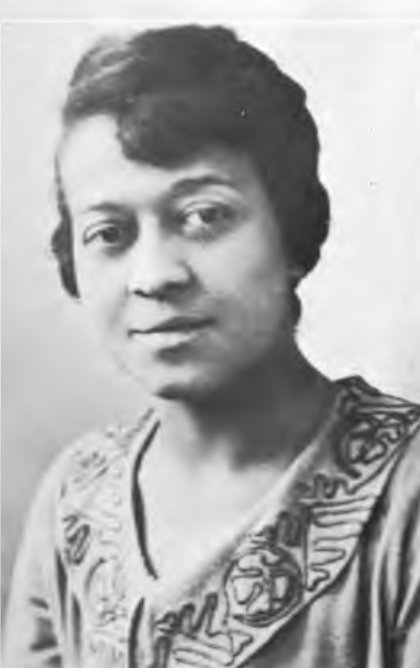
- Helen Hale Tuck, from the 1921 yearbook of Howard University
- Born: 1894; Oberlin, Ohio
- Died: September 6, 1957 (aged 62–63); New York City
- Other name: Helen Cohron
- Occupations: Educator, college dean

Helen Hale Tuck Cohron (1894 – September 6, 1957) was an American educator, clubwoman, and college dean. She was acting Dean of Women at Howard University from 1919 to 1922, and an active clubwoman in Harlem in the 1930s and 1940s.

== Early life and education ==
Tuck was born in Oberlin, Ohio, the daughter of Henson C. Tuck and Ella C. Hale Tuck. Both her parents were born in Ohio; her father, a local businessman, was involved in the Niagara Movement and local politics. She graduated from Oberlin High School in 1912. She earned a bachelor's degree and a teaching certificate in physical education at Oberlin College in 1917. She later earned a master's degree in education at Columbia University.

== Career ==
Tuck moved to Louisville then to Washington, D.C., to be Girl Work Secretary of the War Work Council of the YWCA during World War I. She taught physical education courses at Howard University from 1918 and was acting Dean of Women from 1919 until 1922, when she resigned to marry, and was succeeded by Lucy Diggs Slowe. She also taught at Miner Teachers College.

Tuck was a clubwoman in Cleveland in the late 1920s, then moved to New York City. She served on the board of the National Urban League, and was active in Utopia Children's House, the Juvenile Welfare Council, the Visiting Nurse Service, and the Harlem branch of the YWCA.

== Personal life ==
Helen Tuck married Morehouse College alumnus George E. Cohron, later manager of the Harlem office of the Social Security Board, in 1922. She died in 1957, aged 63 years, in New York City, after a long illness.

Her nephew Arch Parsons was a journalist and newspaper editor in New York, Washington, and Baltimore, and worked in the Carter administration.
