= Sundance (activist) =

American Civil rights activist

- Citizenship: American
- Occupations: Civil rights organizer Executive director of Cleveland American Indian Movement
- Years active: 2006–present
- Organization: Cleveland American Indian Movement (Cleveland AIM)
- Known for: Successful conversion of Oberlin High School offensive mascot to one of neutral nature Opposition to Chief Wahoo and other Native American mascots Successful conversion of Cleveland Indians team name to neutral name.

Sundance is an American Indian civil rights activist. He is perhaps best known for being one of several prominent American Indians to spearhead the movement against the use of Native American imagery as sports mascots.

== Early life ==
Sundance is a member of the Muscogee people, a tribe of Native American people formerly living in the southeastern woodlands.

== Career ==
Sundance is the director of the Cleveland branch of the American Indian Movement (AIM). Cleveland AIM is a member branch of the American Indian Movement Confederation of Autonomous Chapters. Sundance formerly worked as the Business Coordinator for the Oberlin Student Cooperative Association.

== Activism ==
Sundance was active in changing the team name of Cleveland Baseball and repeatedly voiced his opposition against the use of Chief Wahoo as the mascot for the city's baseball team, the Cleveland Indians. He has protested the team's use of the controversial mascot since 2007. "We want the logo gone. We want the team name changed," he said. "You can't do one without the other. There is this propaganda around Cleveland that somehow they are honoring us by having a team named the Indians and the Wahoo logo. So the tide is turning, the wind is changing. They feel that perhaps the Wahoo logo is not honoring us, but somehow the team name is and they haven't listened to the message." Sundance also described the argument in the backdrop of the historical context in which these images are used, and the perceptions that are evoked as a result. "This behavior is exploitative, bigoted, racist and shameful," Sundance told the Cleveland Plain Dealer. "It makes fun of genocide and mocks mass murder. The logo is just the head of an Indian. That means he is an ex-Indian. This has been going on for more than 50 years. I hope it does not continue for another 50."

Before his participation in protests on the national level began, Sundance worked on the issue at the local level. Shortly after moving to Oberlin, Sundance discovered the local high school, Oberlin High School, used a Native American emblem as the school's mascot. He petitioned the local school board in order to convince them to adopt another mascot, in spite of opposition which argued in favor of the mascot's "insignificance". Although several discussions took place before the final decision was rendered, in 2007, the school officially decided to change its mascot and team name, going from the Oberlin Indians to the Oberlin Phoenix.
