= Native American mascot controversy =

Controversy regarding the use of Indigenous names and images by sports teams

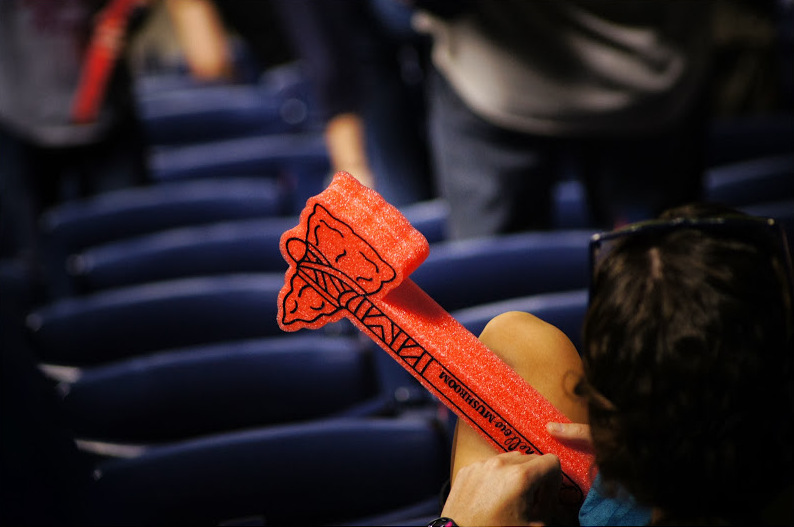
The Atlanta Braves encouraged fans to gesture with the tomahawk chop, distributing foam tomahawks at games and other events.

Since the 1960s, the issue of Native American and First Nations names and images being used by sports teams as mascots has been the subject of increasing public controversy in the United States and Canada. This has been a period of rising Indigenous civil rights movements, and Native Americans and their supporters object to the use of images and names in a manner and context they consider derogatory. They have conducted numerous protests and tried to educate the public on this issue.

In response since the 1970s, an increasing number of secondary schools have retired their Native American names and mascots. Changes accelerated in 2020, following public awareness of institutional racism prompted by nationally covered cases of police misconduct. National attention was focused on the prominent use of names and images by professional franchises including the Washington Commanders (Redskins until July 2020) and the Cleveland Guardians (Indians until November 2021). In Canada, the Edmonton Eskimos became the Edmonton Elks in 2021. Each such change at the professional level has been followed by changes of school teams; for instance, 29 changed their names between August and December 2020. A National Congress of American Indians (NCAI) database tracks some 1,900 K-12 schools in 970 school districts with Native "themed" school mascots.

The issue has been reported in terms of Native Americans being affected by the offensiveness of certain terms, images, and performances. A more comprehensive understanding of the history and context of using Native American names and images is a reason for sports teams to eliminate such usage. Social science research has shown that sports mascots and images are important symbols with deeper psychological and social effects in society. A 2020 analysis of this research indicates only negative effects; those psychologically detrimental to Native American students and to non-Native persons by promoting negative stereotypes and prejudicial ideas of Native Americans and undermining inter-group relations. Based on such research showing negative effects, more than 115 professional organizations representing civil rights, educational, athletic, and scientific experts, have adopted resolutions stating that such use of Native American names and symbols by non-native sports teams is a form of ethnic stereotyping; it promotes misunderstanding and prejudice that contributes to other problems faced by Native Americans.

Defenders of mascots often state their intention to honor Native Americans by referring to positive traits, such as fighting spirit and being strong, brave, stoic, dedicated, and proud; while opponents see these traits as being based upon stereotypes of Native Americans as savages. In general, the social sciences recognize that all ethnic stereotypes, whether positive or negative, are harmful because they promote false or misleading associations between a group and an attribute, fostering a disrespectful relationship. The injustice of such stereotypes is recognized with regard to other racial or ethnic groups, thus mascots are considered morally questionable regardless of offense being taken by individuals. Defenders of the status quo also state that the issue is not important, being only about sports, and that the opposition is nothing more than "political correctness", which change advocates argue ignores the extensive evidence of harmful effects of stereotypes and bias.

The NCAI and over 1,500 national Native organizations and advocates have called for a ban on all Native imagery, names, and other appropriation of Native culture in sports. The joint letter included over 100 Native-led organizations, as well as tribal leaders and members of over 150 federally recognized tribes, reflecting their consensus that Native mascots are harmful. Use of such imagery and terms has declined, but at all levels of American and Canadian sports it remains fairly common. Former Representative Deb Haaland (D-New Mexico), approved in March 2021 as the first Indigenous Secretary of the Interior, has long advocated for teams to change such mascots.

== History ==
European Americans have had a history of "playing Indian" that dates back to the colonial period. In the 19th century, fraternal organizations such as the Tammany Societies and the Improved Order of Red Men adopted the words and material culture of Native Americans in part to establish an aboriginal identity, while ignoring the dispossession and conquest of Indigenous peoples. This practice spread to youth groups, such as the Boy Scouts of America (BSA) (in particular, the Order of the Arrow) and many summer camps. University students in the late 19th and early 20th centuries adopted Indian names and symbols for their sports teams, as traditional Native American life was imagined by European Americans.

Professional team names had similar origins. In professional baseball, the team that is now the Atlanta Braves was founded as the Boston Red Stockings in 1871, becoming the Boston Braves in 1912. Their owner, James Gaffney, was a member of New York City's political machine, Tammany Hall. It was nominally formed to honor Tamanend, a chief of the Lenape, then known as the Delaware. The team that moved to become the Washington Redskins in 1937 was originally also known as the Boston Braves; both the football and baseball teams played at Braves Field. After moving to Fenway Park, home of the Boston Red Sox, the team name was changed to the Boston Redskins in 1933, using a "red" identifier while retaining the Braves "Indian Head" logo. While defenders of the Redskins sometimes say the name honored coach William Henry Dietz, who claimed Native American heritage, the use of Native American names and imagery by this NFL team began in 1932 - before Dietz was hired in 1933.

The Cleveland Indians' name originated from a request by club owner Charles Somers to baseball writers to choose a new name to replace the "Naps", following the departure of their star player Nap Lajoie after the 1914 season. The name "Indians" was chosen. It was a nickname previously applied to the old Cleveland Spiders baseball club during the time when Louis Sockalexis, a member of the Penobscot tribe of Maine, played for Cleveland. The success of the Boston Braves in the 1914 World Series may have been another reason for adopting an Indian mascot. The version that the team is named to honor Sockalexis, as the first Native American to play Major League Baseball, cannot be verified from historical documents. According to a 21st-century account, the contemporary news stories reporting the new name in 1915 make no mention of Sockalexis, but do make numerous insulting references to Native Americans.

The stereotyping of Native Americans must be understood in the context of history which includes conquest, forced relocation, and organized efforts to eradicate native cultures. The government-sponsored boarding schools of the late 19th and early 20th centuries separated young Native Americans from their families in an effort to assimilate them to the mainstream and educate them as European Americans. As stated in an editorial by Carter Meland (Anishinaabe) and David E. Wilkins (Lumbee), both professors of American Indian Studies at the University of Minnesota:

Since the first Europeans made landfall in North America, native peoples have suffered under a weltering array of stereotypes, misconceptions and caricatures. Whether portrayed as noble savages, ignoble savages, teary-eyed environmentalists or, most recently, simply as casino-rich, native peoples find their efforts to be treated with a measure of respect and integrity undermined by images that flatten complex tribal, historical and personal experience into one-dimensional representations that tells us more about the depicters than about the depicted.

== Viewpoints ==
=== Native American ===
Why do these people continue to make a mockery of our culture? In almost every game of hockey, basketball, baseball, and football— whether high school, college, or professional leagues— I see some form of degrading activity being conducted by non-Indians of Indian culture! We Indian people never looked the way these caricatures portray us. Nor have we ever made a mockery of the white people. So then why do they do this to us? It is painful to see the mockery of our ways. It is a deep pain.

— Dennis J. Banks, American Indian Movement, 1970

In the 1940s, the NCAI created a campaign to eliminate negative stereotyping of Native American people in the media. Over time, the campaign began to focus on Indian names and mascots in sports. The NCAI maintains that teams with mascots such as the Braves and the Redskins perpetuate negative stereotypes of Native American people and demean their traditions and rituals. "Often citing a long-held myth by non-Native people that "Indian" mascots "honor Native people," American sports businesses such as the NFL's Washington 'Redskins' and Kansas City 'Chiefs', MLB's Cleveland 'Indians' and Atlanta 'Braves', and the NHL's Chicago Black Hawks, continue to profit from harmful stereotypes originated during a time when white superiority and segregation were commonplace."

Several of the founders of the American Indian Movement, including Clyde Bellecourt, Vernon Bellecourt, Dennis Banks and Russell Means, were among the first to protest team names and mascots such as the Washington Redskins and Chief Wahoo. Vernon Bellecourt also founded the National Coalition Against Racism in Sports and Media (NCARSM) in 1989. Cornel Pewewardy (Comanche-Kiowa), Professor and Director of Indigenous Nations Studies at Portland State University, cites Indigenous mascots as an example of dysconscious racism. By placing images of Native American or First Nations people into an invented media context, this continues to maintain the superiority of the dominant culture. Such practices can be seen as a form of cultural imperialism or neocolonialism.

Native mascots are part of the larger issues of cultural appropriation and the violation of indigenous intellectual property rights. This encompasses all instances when non-natives use indigenous music, art, costumes, etc. in entertainment and commerce. Scholars contend that harm to Native Americans occurs because the appropriation of Native culture by the majority society continues the systems of dominance and subordination that have been used to colonize, assimilate, and oppress Indigenous groups. The use of caricatures of Native Americans as sports mascots has been characterized as contributing to the marginalization of the people in the larger culture. While consultation with other minorities on major projects has improved, decisions affecting Native Americans, such as building the Dakota Access Pipeline, have been made while excluding Native concerns.

Issues related to misunderstanding of Native American legal status have also arisen in cases of foster care or adoption of Native American children. Among these is what is known as the Baby Veronica case, in which a child was adopted by a white family without the consent of her father, an enrolled member of the Cherokee Nation. Federal legislation has been passed to strengthen the priority of tribes in determining the care of their children, as often extended family take over care when needed.

Not all Native Americans totally oppose mascots. Steven Denson (Chickasaw), a professor at Southern Methodist University, has said that there are acceptable ways to use Native American mascots if it is done in a respectful and tasteful manner. He says:

I believe it is acceptable if used in a way that fosters understanding and increased positive awareness of the Native-American culture. And it must also be done with the support of the Native-American community. There is a way to achieve a partnership that works together to achieve mutually beneficial goals.

The NCAI has recognized the right of individual tribes to establish relationships with teams that allow the latter to retain tribal names. For instance, the Spokane Indians, a minor league baseball team, has established a relationship with the Spokane tribe. It has abandoned Native American imagery that it had used when the team was founded in 1903. The logo is an "S" and includes a feather; "Spokane" is written on the team jerseys in Salish, the Spokane language; this is also used for bilingual signs in the ballpark. The mascot is a person dressed as a trout, in reference to the tribe's tradition of fishing. Opponents of Native mascots are divided on this approach. Suzan Shown Harjo says that there is no such thing as a positive stereotype; while Stephanie Fryberg responds that even if the team's use of the name may be respectful, opposing fans may use racist gestures and references.

=== Statements by tribes ===
Indigenous Nations that have officially spoken out against Native mascots include:

- Alabama-Coushatta Tribe of Texas
- Assiniboine and Sioux Tribes of the Fort Peck Indian Reservation, Montana
- California Valley Miwok Tribe, California
- Cayuga Nation
- Cherokee Nation
- Cheyenne River Sioux Tribe of the Cheyenne River Reservation, South Dakota
- Chickasaw Nation
- Choctaw Nation
- Confederated Tribes of the Colville Reservation
- Confederated Tribes of the Goshute Reservation, Nevada and Utah
- Crow Creek Sioux Tribe of the Crow Creek Reservation, South Dakota
- Delaware Tribe of Indians
- Eastern Shawnee Tribe of Oklahoma
- Elem Indian Colony of Pomo Indians of the Sulphur Bank Rancheria, California
- Ewiiaapaayp Band of Kumeyaay Indians, California
- Forest County Potawatomi Community, Wisconsin
- Habematolel Pomo of Upper Lake
- Ho-Chunk Nation of Wisconsin
- Hoh Indian Tribe
- Houlton Band of Maliseet Indians
- Iowa Tribe of Kansas and Nebraska
- Jackson Band of Miwuk Indians
- Keweenaw Bay Indian Community
- Kickapoo Tribe of Indians of the Kickapoo Reservation in Kansas
- Lac Courte Oreilles Band of Lake Superior Chippewa Indians
- Lac du Flambeau Band of Lake Superior Chippewa
- Little River Band of Ottawa Indians
- Little Traverse Bay Bands of Odawa Indians, Michigan
- Match-e-be-nash-she-wish Band of Pottawatomi Indians of Michigan
- Menominee Indian Tribe of Wisconsin
- Middletown Rancheria of Pomo Indians of California
- Miꞌkmaq Nation
- Mohegan Tribe
- Muscogee Nation
- Navajo Nation
- Nez Perce (Nimíipuu)
- Nottawaseppi Huron Band of the Potawatomi, Michigan
- Oglala Sioux Tribe
- Oneida Indian Nation
- Onondaga Nation
- Peoria Tribe of Oklahoma
- Poarch Band of Creek Indians
- Ponca Tribe of Nebraska
- Pokagon Band of Potawatomi Indians
- Prairie Band Potawatomi Nation
- Red Cliff Band of Lake Superior Chippewa Indians of Wisconsin
- Robinson Rancheria
- Rosebud Sioux Tribe of the Rosebud Indian Reservation, South Dakota
- Sac and Fox Tribe of the Mississippi in Iowa (Meskwaki Nation)
- Santee Sioux Nation, Nebraska
- Saint Regis Mohawk Tribe
- Sault Ste. Marie Tribe of Chippewa Indians, Michigan
- Seminole Nation of Oklahoma
- Shawnee Tribe
- Shinnecock Nation
- Shoshone-Bannock Tribes
- Sisseton-Wahpeton Oyate of the Lake Traverse Reservation, South Dakota
- Sokaogon Chippewa Community
- Standing Rock Sioux Tribe of North & South Dakota
- St. Croix Chippewa Indians of Wisconsin
- Stockbridge-Munsee Band of Mohicans
- Wabanaki Confederacy of Maine
- Yankton Sioux Tribe of South Dakota
- Yocha Dehe Wintun Nation, California

=== Social sciences and education ===
A consensus on the damage caused by the use of Native American mascots was stated by the Society of Indian Psychologists in 1999:

Stereotypical and historically inaccurate images of Indians, in general, interfere with learning about them by creating, supporting and maintaining oversimplified and inaccurate views of Indigenous peoples and their cultures. When stereotypical representations are taken as factual information, they contribute to the development of cultural biases and prejudices, (clearly a contradiction to the educational mission of the University.) In the same vein, we believe that continuation of the use of Indians as symbols and mascots is incongruous with the philosophy espoused by many Americans as promoting inclusivity and diversity.

Sports mascots have been cited as an example of microaggressions, the everyday insults that members of marginalized minority groups are subject to by other groups in society.

In 2005, the American Psychological Association (APA) issued a resolution "Recommending the Immediate Retirement of American Indian Mascots, Symbols, Images, and Personalities by Schools, Colleges, Universities, Athletic Teams, and Organizations" due to the harm done by creating a hostile environment, the negative effects on the self-esteem of American Indian children, and discrimination that may violate civil rights. Such use also affects non-natives: by reinforcing mainstream stereotypes, and preventing learning about Native American culture. The APA states that stereotyping is disrespectful of the beliefs, traditions and values of Native Americans. In 2021, the New York Association of School Psychologists reiterated the APA position on Native mascots in its position statement advocating the inclusion of Indigenous persons in educational programs regarding diversity.

Similar resolutions have been adopted by the North American Society for the Sociology of Sport, the American Sociological Association, the American Counseling Association, and the American Anthropological Association. In a 2005 report on the status of Native American students, the National Education Association included the elimination of Indian mascots and sports team names as a recommendation for improvement. In 2018, the Robert Wood Johnson Foundation announced it would no longer consider teams with racist mascots, such as the Kansas City and Washington football teams, for its annual RWJF Sports Award; this recognizes organizations that contribute to public health through sports.

Social science research has substantiated the objections by Native Americans to use of such elements. In particular, studies support the view that sports mascots and images are not trivial. Stereotyping directly affects academic performance and self-esteem of Native American students, contributing to other issues faced by Native Americans, including suicide, unemployment, and poverty. European Americans exposed to mascots are more likely to believe not only that stereotypes are true, but that Native Americans have no identity beyond these stereotypes. Two studies examining the effect of exposure to an American Indian sports mascot found a tendency to endorse stereotypes of a different minority group (Asian Americans), which is indicative of a "spreading effect". Exposure to any stereotypes increased the likelihood of stereotypical thinking; demonstrating the harm done to society by stereotyping of any kind. A connection between stereotyping and racism of any group increasing the likelihood of stereotyping others was made by Native Americans opposing the "Indians" mascot in Skowhegan, Maine, when fliers promoting the KKK were distributed in that town.

=== Civil rights ===
The National Association for the Advancement of Colored People (NAACP) passed a resolution calling for the end of the use of Native American names, images, and mascots in 1999.

In 2001, the U.S. Commission on Civil Rights released an advisory opinion calling for an end to the use of Native American images and team names by non-Native schools. While recognizing the right to freedom of expression, the commission also recognizes those Native Americans and civil rights advocates that maintain these mascots, by promoting stereotypes, may violate anti-discrimination laws. When found in educational institutions, mascots may also create a hostile environment inconsistent with learning to respect diverse cultures, but instead teach that stereotypes that misrepresent a minority group are permissible. Those schools that claim that their sports imagery stimulate interest in Native American culture have not listened to Native groups and civil rights leaders who point out that even purportedly positive stereotypes both present a false portrayal of the past and prevent understanding of contemporary Native people as fellow Americans.

In a report issued in 2012, a United Nations expert on Human Rights of Indigenous Peoples cited the continued use of Native American references by sports team as a part of the stereotyping that "obscures understanding of the reality of Native Americans today and instead help to keep alive racially discriminatory attitudes." Justice Murray Sinclair, the head of Canada's Truth and Reconciliation Commission said in 2015 "sports teams with offensive names, such as Redskins and cartoonish aboriginal-looking mascots have no place in a country trying to come to grips with racism in its past".

In testimony at a session of the Nebraska Advisory Committee of the U.S. Commission on Civil Rights in December 2020, local Tribal leaders said it's time for the 22 schools statewide to review their use of Native American names, symbols, and images for their mascots. The Nebraska School Activities Association which oversees interscholastic sports indicated support for ongoing discussion, but that they had no authority to issue statewide mandates regarding mascots. University of Nebraska Omaha Professor Edouardo Zendejas, a member of the Omaha Tribe of Nebraska, in addition to advocating legislation, sees the need to revise the history curriculum to include accurate information regarding Native Americans which is currently lacking.

==== Legal remedies ====
While all advocates for elimination of Native mascots agree that the practice is morally wrong, many do not find a basis for legal remedy based upon violation of civil rights. Civil rights law in the United States reflect the difference between the experience of racism by African Americans and Native Americans. The effects of slavery continued after emancipation in the form of discrimination that insured a continued source of cheap labor. What European Americans wanted from Native Americans was not labor but land, and many were willing to have native people themselves assimilate. Continued discrimination came to those who refused to do so, but asserted their separate identity and rights of sovereignty. The appropriation of native cultures is therefore seen as discriminatory practice by some but is not understood as such by those that think of assimilation as a positive process. The difference is reflected in the continued popularity of Native Americans as mascots when similar usage of the names and images of any other ethnic group, in particular African Americans, would be unthinkable, and the continued claim that the stereotype of the "noble savage" honors Native Americans.

In February 2013, the Michigan Department of Civil Rights (MDCR) filed a complaint with the US Department of Education's Office for Civil Rights (OCR). MDCR's complaint asserted that new research clearly establishes that use of American Indian imagery negatively impacts student learning, creating an unequal learning environment in violation of Article VI of the Civil Rights Act of 1964. In June 2013, the OCR dismissed the case on the basis that the legal standard required not only harm, but the intent to do harm, which was not established.

A legal claim of discrimination rests upon a group agreeing that a particular term or practice is offensive, thus opponents of mascot change often point to individuals claiming Native American heritage who say they are not offended. This raised the difficulty of Native American identity in the United States, also an evolving controversy.

=== Religious organizations ===
In 1992, the Central Conference of American Rabbis issued a resolution calling for the end of sports teams names that promote racism, in particular the Atlanta Braves and the Washington Redskins. In 2001, the Unitarian Universalist Association passed a resolution to establish relationships with groups working to end the use of Indian images and symbols for sports and media mascots. In 2004, the United Methodist Church also passed a resolution condemning the use of Native American team names and sports mascots, which was highlighted in a meeting of the Black caucus of that organization in 2007.

A child once asked me why Indians were "mean." Where did he get that idea? By schools such as the University of Illinois "honoring" my ancestors?

— Rev. Alvin Deer (Kiowa/Creek), United Methodist Church

In 2013 group of sixty-one religious leaders in Washington, D.C. sent a letter to NFL Commissioner Roger Goodell and Redskins owner Daniel Snyder stating their moral obligation to join the "Change the Mascot" movement due to the offensive and inappropriate nature of the name which causes pain whether or not that is intended.

Members of the Indian Affairs Committee of the Baltimore Yearly Meeting of the Society of Friends approved a formal statement condemning the name of the Washington football team, stating that "the NFL has violated its core principles for decades by allowing the team playing in Washington, D.C., to carry the name 'redskins,' a racist epithet that insults millions of Native Americans. Continued use of the term encourages and perpetuates persecution, disrespect, and bigotry against Native men, women, and children". The Torch Committee, the student government organization of the Sandy Spring Friends School in the Maryland suburbs of Washington, voted to ban any apparel on the campus which includes the Redskins name, although the logo would continue to be allowed.

In a meeting March 1, 2014, the Board of Directors of the Central Atlantic Conference of the United Church of Christ (UCC) unanimously passed a resolution proposing that its members boycott Washington Redskins games and shun products bearing the team's logo until the team changes its name and mascot. Redskin's spokesman Tony Wyllie offered a response, saying, "We respect those who disagree with our team's name, but we wish the United Church of Christ would listen to the voice of the overwhelming majority of Americans, including Native Americans, who support our name and understand it honors the heritage and tradition of the Native American community." At its annual meeting in June 2014, the membership of the UCC also passed a resolution supporting the boycott. The resolution and boycott was passed by the National Synod of the UCC in June, 2015.

In 2025, Bishop David Wilson (Choctaw) of the United Methodist Church, the first Indigenous American to hold that position, called on leaders of churches to speak out against the reintroduction of racist mascots and images

=== Popular opinion ===
Individuals for whom being American as central to their sense of self, the reality of Native oppression (e.g., genocide, police brutality) threatens their positive national identity. Native mascots erase and dehumanize Natives, and protect that identity. The recent decisions by Washington and Cleveland has not altered the opinions of many who continue to argue that mascots are meant to be an honor to Native Americans, representing bravery, fighting spirit, or prowess. They dismiss efforts to cancel the names and images as political correctness masquerading as morality.

General public opinion is shifting towards approval of eliminating mascots, with a majority of fans and younger people supporting recent changes by professional teams, as indicated by an Nielsen poll conducted in March 2021.

The topic became an issue on a national level in the twenty-first century, with a hearing before the US Senate Committee on Indian Affairs in 2011, and a symposium at the Smithsonian National Museum of the American Indian in 2013. In November, 2015 President Obama, speaking at the White House Tribal Nations Conference, stated "Names and mascots of sports teams like the Washington Redskins perpetuate negative stereotypes of Native Americans" and praised Adidas for a new initiative to help schools change names and mascots by designing new logos and paying for part of the cost of new uniforms.

Mainstream opinion reflects the function of identification with a sports team in both individual and group psychology. There are many benefits associated with sports fandom, both private (increased self-esteem) and public (community solidarity). The activity of viewing sporting events provide shared experiences that reinforce personal and group identification with a team. The name, mascot, cheerleaders, and marching band performances reinforce and become associated with these shared experiences. In an open letter published in 2013, Daniel Snyder explicitly invoked these associations with family, friends, and an 81-year tradition as being the most important reasons for keeping the Redskins name. When self-esteem becomes bound to the players and the team, there are many beneficial but also some unfortunate consequences, including denial or rationalization of misbehavior. However, for some, the identity being expressed is one of supremacy, with the defense of native mascots being clearly racist.

Some individuals who support the use of Native American mascots state that they are meant to be respectful, and to pay homage to Native American people. Many have made the argument that Native American mascots focus on bravery, courage and fighting skills rather than anything derogatory. Karl Swanson, vice-president of the Washington Redskins professional football team in 2003, declared in the magazine Sports Illustrated that his team's name "symbolizes courage, dignity, and leadership", and that the "Redskins symbolize the greatness and strength of a grand people".

However, many note that the behavior of fans at games is not respectful. Richard Lapchick, director emeritus of Northeastern University's Center for the Study of Sport in Society, in an article: "Could you imagine people mocking African Americans in black face at a game? Yet go to a game where there is a team with an Indian name and you will see fans with war paint on their faces. Is this not the equivalent to black face?"

Others claim Native American mascots help promote the culture to those who might be unaware of its significance. Chief Illiniwek, the former mascot for the University of Illinois, became the subject of protest in 1988. In 1990 the Board of Trustees of the University of Illinois called the mascot a dignified symbol: "His ceremonial dance is done with grace and beauty. The Chief keeps the memory of the people of a great Native American tribe alive for thousands of Illinoisans who otherwise would know little or nothing of them." However, the mascot costume was not based on the clothing of the people of the Illinois Confederation, but of the Lakota people, and the first three men to portray Illiniwek were not performing authentic Native American dances, but routines they had learned from other non-Native hobbyists in the Boy Scouts of America. The Peoria people are the closest living descendants of the Illiniwek Confederacy. In response to requests by those who had portrayed the mascot to bring back occasional performances, Peoria Chief John P. Froman reaffirmed the tribe's position that Chief (Illiniwek) "was not in any way representative of Peoria culture". Since the 2020s, there has been a movement among students and alumni to make the belted kingfisher an official mascot of the University of Illinois, an orange and blue bird (the school's colors) that can be found in the state of Illinois. A kingfisher costume was created by students and the kingfisher has made appearances during campus events. The kingfisher has been endorsed by multiple Indigenous Nations and organizations, and has been supported by students in multiple referendums. The proposed mascot has not yet been approved by the Chancellor of the University.

Conservative columnists have asserted that outrage over mascots is manufactured by white liberals, rather than being the authentic voice of Native Americans.

==== Other team names and ethnic groups ====
Many argue there is a double standard in Native Americans being so frequently used as a sports team name or mascot when the same usage would be unthinkable for other racial or ethnic group. One current exception is the Coachella Valley High School "Arabs" which has also been the subject of controversy, resulting in the retirement of its more cartoonish representations.

The University of Notre Dame Fighting Irish and the University of Louisiana at Lafayette's "Ragin' Cajuns" are sometimes cited as counter-arguments to those that favor change. However, rather than referring to "others" these teams employ symbols that European American cultures have historically used to represent themselves. The University of Notre Dame mascot, the Leprechaun, is a mythical being that represents the Irish, which is both an ethnic and a national group. The University of Louisiana at Lafayette mascot is an anthropomorphic cayenne pepper, an ingredient frequently found in Cajun cuisine. Proponents of change also see a false equivalency in the argument that if one group is not insulted by a particular portrayal, then no group has the right to feel insulted, which only serves to discount what Native American voices are saying. This argument ignores the vastly different backgrounds, treatment, and social positions of the groups; and the effects of systemic racism that continues to impact Native Americans but no longer white minorities such as the Irish. Also ignored are the cumulative effects of hundreds of Native mascots compared to the rare use of a white ethnic mascot.

The U.S. Commission on Civil Rights call for an end to the use of Native American mascots was only for non-native schools. In cases where universities were founded to educate Native Americans, such mascots may not be examples of cultural appropriation or stereotyping. Examples include the Fighting Indians of the Haskell Indian Nations University and the University of North Carolina at Pembroke (UNCP), which continues to have a substantial number of native students, and close ties to the Lumbee tribe. The UNCP nickname is the Braves, but the mascot is a red-tailed hawk. Pembroke Middle School, which also has close ties to the Lumbee tribe, is nicknamed the Warriors.

==== Financial impact of change ====
Many supporters of Native American mascots feel that the financial cost of changing mascots would outweigh the benefits. Sales of merchandise with team mascots and nicknames generate millions of dollars in sales each year, and teams contend that a change in team mascots would render this merchandise useless. The cost of removing images from uniforms and all other items, which must be paid out of local school funds, is a greater factor for secondary schools. Opponents feel that despite the cost of a change in team mascots, it should be done to prevent what they believe is racial stereotyping. Clyde Bellecourt, when director of the American Indian Movement stated: "It's the behavior that accompanies all of this that's offensive. The rubber tomahawks, the chicken feather headdresses, people wearing war paint and making these ridiculous war whoops with a tomahawk in one hand and a beer in the other; all of these have significant meaning for us. And the psychological impact it has, especially on our youth, is devastating."

A study done by the Emory University Goizueta Business School indicates that the growing unpopularity of Native American mascots is a financial drain for professional teams, losing money compared to more popular animal mascots. Writing for Forbes in response to the statewide mascot ban passed by Maine in 2019, marketing analyst Henry DeVries compares Native mascots to the retired "Frito Bandito" mascot, and argues that "offensive marketing mascots" are a bad idea financially and "on the wrong side of history".

==== Public opinion surveys ====
A survey conducted in 2002 by The Harris Poll for Sports Illustrated (SI) found that 81% of Native Americans who live outside traditional Indian reservations and 53% of Indians on reservations did not find the images discriminatory. The authors of the article concluded that "Although most Native American activists and tribal leaders consider Indian team names and mascots offensive, neither Native Americans in general nor a cross section of U.S. sports fans agree". According to the article, "There is a near total disconnect between Indian activists and the Native American population on this issue." An Indian activist commented on the results saying "that Native Americans' self-esteem has fallen so low that they don't even know when they're being insulted". Soon after the SI article, a group of five social scientists experienced in researching the mascot issue published a journal article arguing against the validity of this survey and its conclusions. First they state that "The confidence with which the magazine asserts that a 'disconnect' between Native American activists and Native Americans exists on this issue belies the serious errors in logic and accuracy made in the simplistic labeling of Native Americans who oppose mascots as 'activists.'"

A flaw unique to polls of Native Americans is they rely upon self-identification to select the target population. In an editorial in the Bloomington Herald Times, Steve Russell (an enrolled Cherokee citizen and associate professor of criminal justice at Indiana University), states that both SI and Annenberg's samples of "self-identified Native Americans ... includes plenty of people who have nothing to do with Indians". Individuals claiming to be Native American when they are not is well known in academic research, and people claiming Indian identity specifically to gain authority in the debate over sports mascots has been criticised.

== Trends ==
The National Congress of American Indians (NCAI) states that as of 2020 there were 1,916 schools in 1,025 school districts that use such mascots.

While protests began in the 1970s, national attention to the issue did not occur until widespread television coverage of college and professional games brought the behavior of some fans to the attention of Native Americans. The appearance of the Atlanta Braves in the 1991 World Series and the Washington Redskins at the 1992 Super Bowl prompted the largest response because the games were played in Minneapolis, Minnesota, which has a large Native American population.

The documents most often cited to justify the elimination of Native mascots are the advisory opinion by the United States Commission on Civil Rights in 2001 and a resolution by the American Psychological Association in 2005. Neither of these documents refer to subjective perceptions of offensiveness, but to scientific evidence of harms and legal definitions of discrimination. However, the issue is often discussed in the media in terms of feelings and opinions, and prevents full understanding of the history and context of the use of Native American names and images and why their use by sports teams should be eliminated.

Individual school districts have responded to complaints by local Native American individuals and tribes, or have made changes due to an increased awareness of the issue among educators and students. New Native mascots have not been proposed in recent decades, or are withdrawn before becoming official due to public opposition. For example, in 2016 when one of the teams in the National College Prospects Hockey League (NCPHL) was announced as the Lake Erie Warriors with a caricature Mohawk logo it was immediately changed to the Lake Erie Eagles. Little League International updated its 2019 rulebook to include a statement prohibiting "the use of team names, mascots, nicknames or logos that are racially insensitive, derogatory or discriminatory in nature." This decision has been applauded by the National Congress of American Indians. In February, 2019 US Lacrosse issued a position statement which said in part "As the sport's national governing body, US Lacrosse believes that the misuse of Native American nicknames, logos, and mascots reflect and promote misleading stereotypes that are degrading and harmful to Native Americans. We will make every effort to assure that offensive or stereotypical mascots and logos will not be visible or promoted at events that US Lacrosse controls."

=== Legal and administrative action ===
Laws, resolutions, or school board decisions regarding team names and mascots have been approved mostly in states with significant Native American populations. In 2022 Kansas approved a non-binding resolution encouraging the elimination of Native mascots within the next five years. Other states to legally restrict the use of Native mascots include California (2015), Colorado (2021), Michigan (2012), Nevada (2021), Oregon (2012), and Washington (2021). These laws allow for exemption for schools gaining approval agreements with local tribes. To date, Maine is the only state to completely ban Native American-themed mascots.

The New York State Education Department (NYSED) issued a memo in November 2022 requiring schools with a Native American mascot to find a replacement by the end of the 2022–23 school year. Those schools that fail to do so without current approval from a recognized tribe may be in willful violation of the Dignity for All Students Act. The penalties for such a violation include the removal of school officers and the withholding of State Aid. The deadline was revised to June 2025.

=== Secondary schools and youth leagues ===
Secondary schools in both the United States and Canada have displayed a range of actions, with some voluntarily changing names or images, while others have kept current mascots. A 2013 analysis of a database indicated that more than 2,000 high schools have mascots that referred to Native American culture. Following a period of extended population growth in both countries over 50 years, this compares to around 3,000 schools with such names at the beginning of that period.

==== Canada ====
The Department of Educational Foundations at the University of Saskatchewan passed a resolution in 2013 calling for the retirement of all school mascots and logos that depict First Nations people.

In addition to changing their sports mascots, school boards in Ontario in 2016 were considering a ban on students wearing any articles bearing offensive names or logos, whether related to professional or local teams.

Since the early 21st century, the Nepean Redskins Football Club, a minor league youth team operating for 35 years in Ottawa, Ontario, had been asked to change its name. In 2013 Ian Campeau (Ojibway), a musician and activist in Ottawa, filed a human rights complaint against the team on behalf of his five-year-old daughter. Campeau said, "How are they going to differentiate the playing field from the school yard? What's going to stop them from calling my daughter a redskin in the school yard? That's as offensive as using the n-word." Assembly of First Nations National Chief Shawn Atleo said he supported this suit because the word "Redskin" is "offensive and hurtful and completely inappropriate. The team changed its name to the "Nepean Eagles" for the 2014 season; it was chosen from 70 suggestions submitted. Niigaan Sinclair (Anishinaabe), a writer and assistant professor at the University of Manitoba, applauded the team's action. He contrasted it with the insistence at the time of Daniel Snyder, owner of the professional Washington Redskins team in the US, in keeping that name. (Note: The Washington team did change its name in 2020.)

In 2017, the Swift Current Indians baseball club changed its name to the Swift Current 57's.

==== United States ====
The Oregon State Board of Education voted in 2012 to ban Oregon public schools from using Native Americans as mascots. An exception was made in 2014 to allow schools to keep their mascots if a local federally-recognized tribe agreed. Schools using a "Warriors" mascot were allowed to keep the name if any Native American imagery was changed. Changes made following the policy include The Dalles High School Eagle Indians changing to the "Riverhawks", the Reedsport Community Charter School Braves to the singular "Brave" (as an adjective), and the Mohawk High School Indians to the "Mustangs".

The city school board in Rutland, Vermont voted in 2020 to drop Rutland High School's "Raiders" name and arrowhead logo. "Ravens" was selected at the new mascot in 2021. In January 2022 the board voted 6–5 to reinstate the Raiders name after a long debate.

In January 2020 the school board of Killingly High School in Connecticut, had a Republican majority. It voted to reinstate the team's "Redmen" mascot. The vote reflects a generational split, as the new school board members represent mainly older alumni in the town. Current students of the public high school, its faculty and Native Americans supported dropping the Redmen mascot. A senior active in the debate said, "We look racist ... this is not what I want our school to be known for." The mascot had been removed after the Nipmuc Tribal Council objected to it, saying that no Native mascots were flattering to Native Americans. In October 2019, "Red Hawks" had been chosen as the new mascot, but after a contentious meeting in December, the School Board decided the school would have no mascot. Renewed discussion of whether the mascot is offensive had begun in June 2019, prompted by a student initiative. The name change was used as a wedge issue in the 2019 municipal elections; there was a record turnout and several Republican victories.

This issue was dealt with differently in Maine, where there was also support for changing such offensive names. In Skowhegan, Maine, where the area high school sports team was named the "Indians", the Penobscot Nation and the ACLU of Maine urged that it be changed. In March 2019 the local School Board voted to eliminate the mascot at Skowhegan Area High School. This was the last school in the state to retire this name. Similarly, at several other schools with sports teams named "Warriors", Native American imagery was removed. By early March 2019, in independent actions through the state, Maine was the first state to eliminate Indigenous mascots in all secondary schools. In keeping with this movement, a bill to ban Native American mascots in all public schools passed the Maine House of Representatives and Senate, and was signed into law by Governor Janet Mills in May 2019. This was another first for the state.

Due to media coverage of the controversy over the prominent Washington Redskins, high schools with the sports teams named Redskins have received particular attention across the country. Three have a majority of Native American students. Advocates for the name suggest that, because some Native Americans use the name to refer to themselves, it is not insulting. But, the principal of Red Mesa High School, a Native American-majority school in Teec Nos Pos, Arizona, said that use of the word outside American Indian communities should be avoided because it could perpetuate "the legacy of negativity that the term has created."

In 2001, the commissioner of the New York State Education Department sent a letter to all New York school boards calling for the elimination of Native American mascots. The Seneca Nation Tribal Council responded with support for the Warrior imagery in the Salamanca school. Other members of the community also wanted to retain it. Some 26% of the Salamanca Central High School students are Native American (primarily Seneca), and its sports teams were called the "Warriors". Since the late 20th century, keeping the Warrior sports identity has resulted in negotiations in Salamanca between the Seneca and non-Seneca populations and actions that have raised general awareness of true Seneca culture. For example, the school logo was changed to accurately depict a Seneca man; this replaced a stereotypical Plains Indian warrior image that had been used prior to 1978.

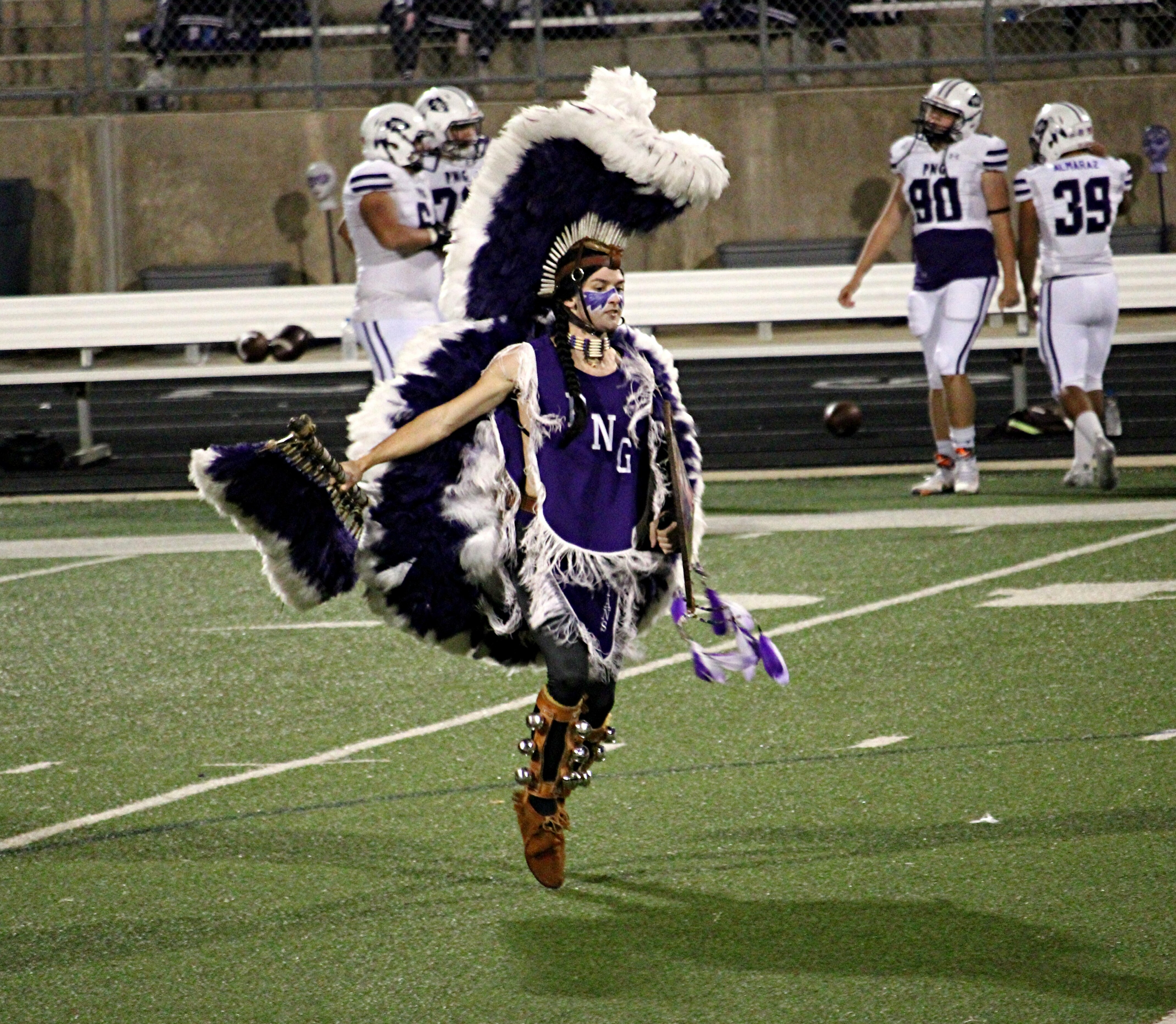
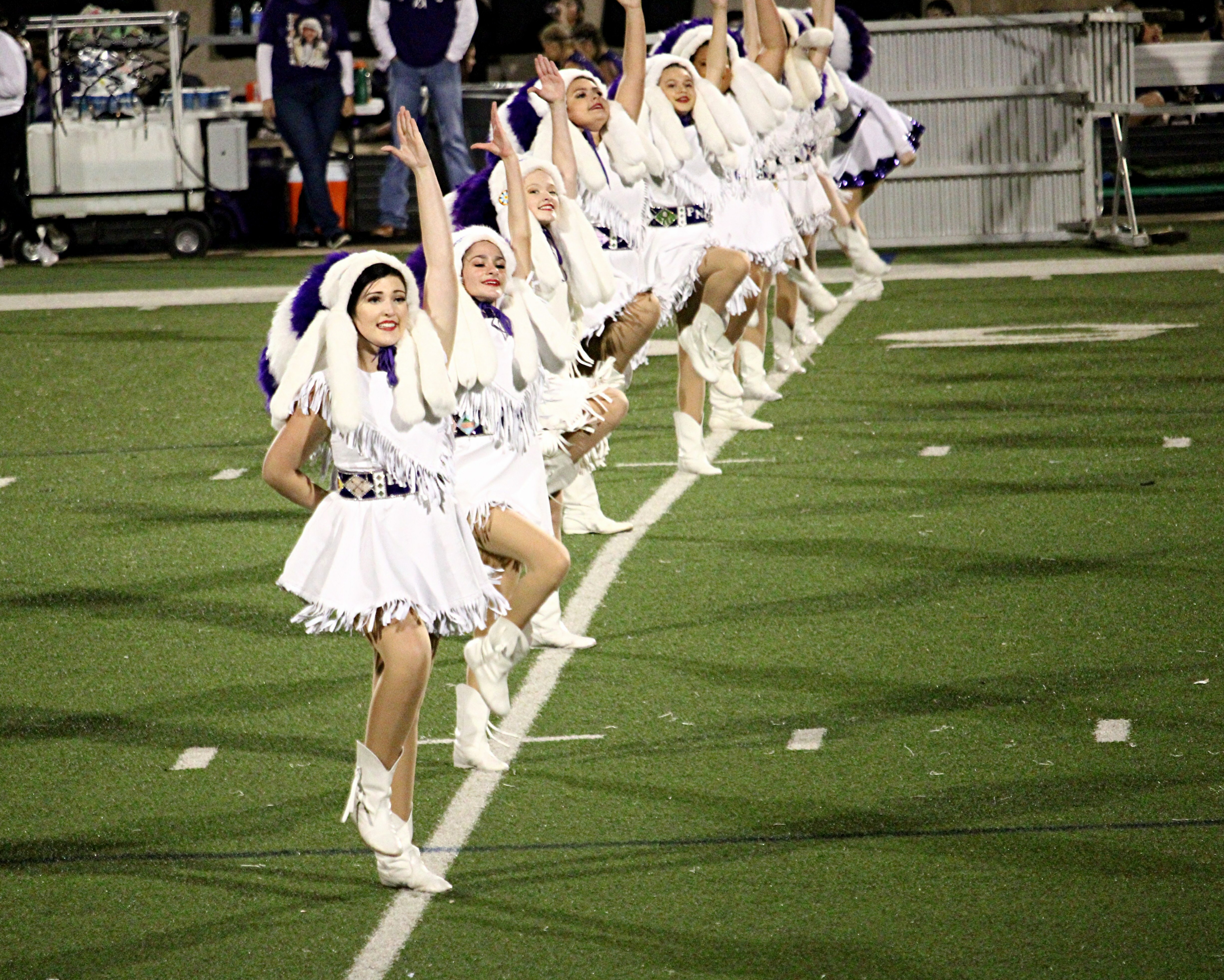
Port Neches–Groves High School students during a halftime performance in December 2020

The Port Neches–Groves High School "Indian" mascot has garnered controversy for being racist and culturally insensitive. These depictions include the use of the chant "Scalp 'Em", referring to the school's football field as "the reservation", and cheerleaders crafting and wearing ersatz war bonnets, among others. No residents of Port Neches or Groves identify as solely American Indian. The school administration has repeatedly stated they would not change their traditions or mascot, including turning down a general offer from Adidas to provide free design resources and financial assistance to change the imagery.

In 2020, the Cherokee Nation called for the school to discontinue its use of the mascot. In March 2022, the school's "Indianettes" drill team chanted the phrase "Scalp 'Em" during a performance at Walt Disney World's Magic Kingdom after being told they would not be allowed to wear their war bonnets. Disney released a statement condemning the performance and stating the Indianettes had not been in the school's audition tape. In the wake of the controversy, the Cherokee Nation renewed its demand that the high school drop the mascot and end its Indian-related traditions.

Also taking place in 2022 was the New York State Education Department's decision to require every school district in the state with Native American-themed mascots – or Native American-themed team names (such as "Warriors") – to change them unless receiving approval for an exemption from a state- or federally-recognized tribe; any district which does not comply would risk having state funds withheld and administrators being removed. Many applauded the decision – including several members of the Shinnecock Indian Nation on Long Island – while many others questioned the purpose and constitutionality of the ban. A controversy regarding the ban arose in 2023, when New York state denied the Wyandanch Union Free School District's proposal to retain their "Warriors" nickname while removing the associated images – despite the fact that the proposal in Wyandanch was supported by the Shinnecock Nation. The nearby Massapequa Union Free School District sued around the same time, arguing that the ban is unconstitutional.

=== Colleges and universities ===
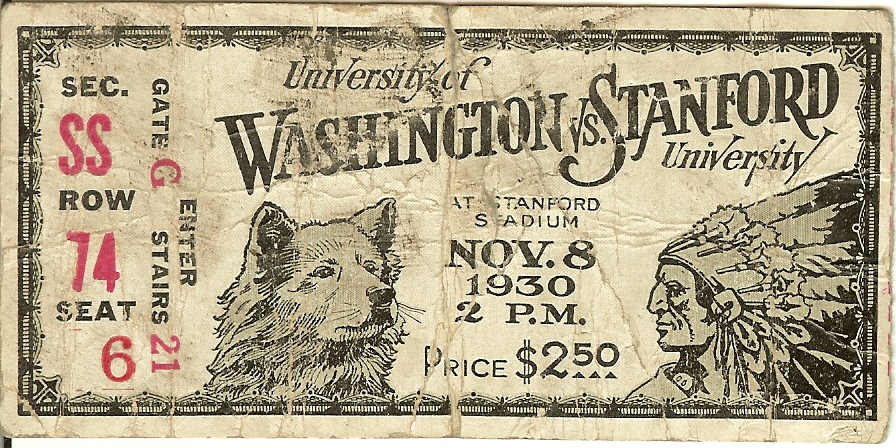
1930 football ticket stub depicting the former Stanford Indian mascot

Some college teams voluntarily changed their names and mascots. Stanford University had "The Stanford Indian" as its mascot from 1930 to 1972. Today Stanford's athletic team identity is built around the "Stanford Cardinal", reflecting the primary school color that has been used from the earliest days, while the unofficial mascot shown on its primary logo is the Stanford Tree. Another early change was the "Saltine Warrior" that represented Syracuse University from 1931 until 1978. After a brief attempt to use a Roman warrior, the mascot became Otto the Orange for the school color. Miami University began discussion regarding the propriety of the Redskins name and images in 1972, and changed its team nickname to RedHawks in 1996.

Although Dartmouth College had not used an Indian mascot for many years, Yale University printed a program for the 2016 game commemorating its 100th game against Dartmouth showing historical program covers featuring depictions of Native Americans that are now viewed as racist.

The Utah Utes of the University of Utah use the Ute name in its athletic organizations with the explicit permission from the Ute Indian Tribe. This permission was reaffirmed in 2020.

==== National Collegiate Athletic Association ====
The National Collegiate Athletic Association (NCAA) distributed a "self evaluation" to 31 colleges in 2005, for teams to examine the use of potentially offensive imagery with their mascot choice. Nineteen teams were cited as having potentially "hostile or abusive" names, mascots, or images, that would be banned from displaying them during post-season play, and prohibited from hosting tournaments. Subsequently, all of the colleges previously using Native American imagery changed except for those granted waivers when they obtained official support from individual tribes based upon the principle of tribal sovereignty.

San Diego State University (SDSU) was not cited by the NCAA in 2005 due to a decision that the Aztecs were not a Native American tribe with any living descendants. However, in February 2017 the SDSU Native American Student Alliance (NASA) supported removal of the mascot, calling its continued use "institutional racism" in its official statement to the Committee on Diversity, Equity and Outreach. A task force of students, faculty, and alumni was appointed to study the issue and make a recommendation by April 2018. The recommendation was to keep the mascot but take steps to use only respectful references to Aztec culture.

In 2008, the NCAA and the University of North Dakota (UND) agreed to retire the university's Fighting Sioux name unless UND received approval from both the Standing Rock and Spirit Lake Sioux tribes by the end of 2010. The Spirit Lake tribal members approved retaining the name, but the Standing Rock tribal council did not allow their members to vote on retaining the name. Therefore, UND selected "Fighting Hawks" as their new nickname in 2015.

The Florida State Seminoles of Florida State University use names and images associated with the Seminole people. The use is by agreement with the Florida Seminole Tribal Council and not the Seminole Nation of Oklahoma which is much larger than the Florida Seminole tribe. The Seminole Nation of Oklahoma "condemns the use of all American Indian sports team mascots in the public school system, by college and university level and by professional teams." The NCAA allows the use even though the NCAA "continues to believe the stereotyping of Native Americans is wrong."

=== Professional teams ===
==== Current usage ====
===== Atlanta Braves =====
The Atlanta Braves continue to use the tomahawk chop (although it began at Florida State University). In February 2019 after the removal of the Cleveland Indians' Chief Wahoo logo, MLB commissioner Rob Manfred said, "The Braves have taken steps to take out the tomahawk chop". In October, St. Louis Cardinals pitcher Ryan Helsley, a member of the Cherokee Nation, said that the tomahawk chop and chant misrepresents Native Americans. In response to this complaint, the Atlanta Braves, in their October 9 game against the Cardinals, did not provide fans with foam tomahawks, although the music accompanying the chant was played while fans performed the arm gesture. When the Braves lost to the Cardinals 13–1, the San Francisco Bay Area Fox affiliate used the headline "Braves Scalped", drawing criticism as an example of why most Native Americans oppose the use of American Indian imagery and mascots in sports. The station soon apologized. The team front office said in 2019 that there would be talks with Native Americans during the off-season regarding the tomahawk chop tradition, while leaders of two tribes that once inhabited Georgia, the Cherokee and the Muscogee (Creek) Nation agree that the tradition is inappropriate.

The continued performance of the tomahawk chop and war chant by Braves fans was made highly visible nationally by the team's appearance in the 2021 World Series. The Braves were defended by MLB Commissioner Manfred, who referred to the support of the team by Richard Sneed, principal chief of the Eastern Band of Cherokee Indians. Other Native American leaders around the country continue to describe "the Chop" and its associated fan behavior as deeply insulting while avoiding direct criticism of Sneed. Psychologist Stephanie Fryberg believes personal opinions have little to do with the potential detrimental effects of mascots to Native American youth and communities.

===== Chicago Blackhawks =====
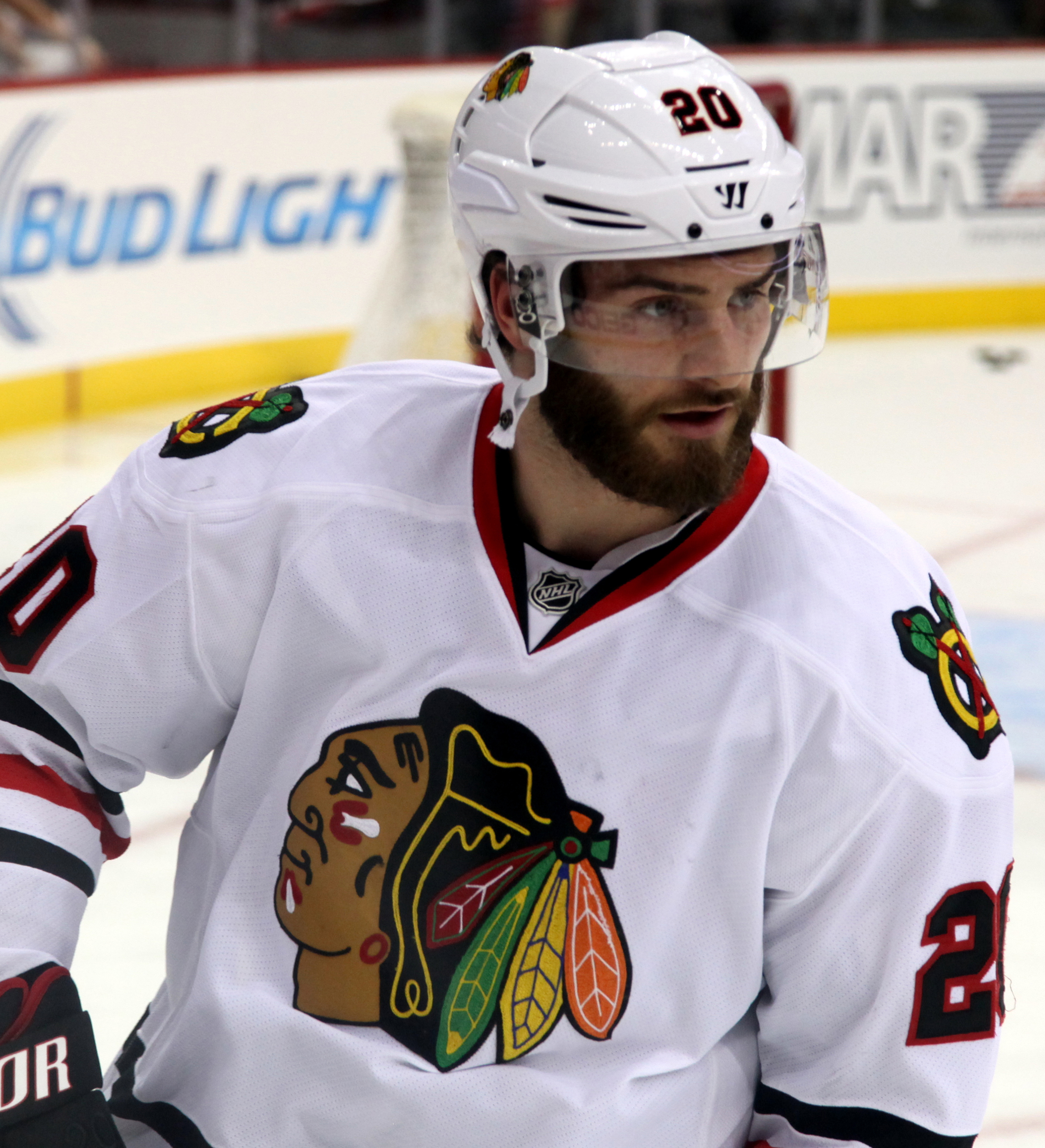
Blackhawks jersey worn by Brandon Saad (2014)

It is argued that the Chicago Blackhawks have escaped the scrutiny given to other teams using Native imagery because hockey is not a cultural force in the United States on the level of football. The National Congress of American Indians opposes the Blackhawks' logo, as it does all Native American mascots.

The team's name originates from the nickname applied to the United States Army's 86th Infantry Division, the "Black Hawks"; the nickname originated from prominent Sauk chief Black Hawk, who aligned himself with the British during the War of 1812 and who fought against the United States and faced genocide during the Black Hawk War. Team founder Frederic McLaughlin had served in the division on the Western Front during World War I, where he learned the nickname.

In 2019, the American Indian Center of Chicago ended all ties to the Chicago Blackhawks Foundation, stating they will no longer affiliate "with organizations that perpetuate stereotypes through the use of 'Indian' mascots." The AIC said that they "previously held a relationship with the Chicago Blackhawks Foundation with the intention of educating the general public about American Indians and the use of logos and mascots. The AIC, along with members of the community have since decided to end this relationship" and stated that "going forward, AIC will have no professional ties with the Blackhawks, or any other organization that perpetuates harmful stereotypes."

The Chi-Nations Youth Council (CNYC), an Indigenous youth organization in Chicago, said in 2020, "The Chicago Blackhawks name and logo symbolizes a legacy of imperialism and genocide." "As statues of invaders, slave holders, and white supremacists fall across the nation so too should the images and language of the savage and dead 'Indians'." CNYC also noted "As social consciousness has grown over the past decades so has the Blackhawks performative gestures of buying their reprieve from those willing to sell out the health and humanity of our future generations."

In July 2020, the team banned fans from wearing Native American headdresses while attending team events.

As of 2025, the team still openly maintains a partnership with Chief Black Hawk's Sac and Fox Nation tribe.

In 2024, one of Black Hawk's lineal descendants, April Holder (Sauk and Fox, Wichita, Tonkawa) called on the team to stop profiting off of her ancestor's name and image, comparing it to identity theft and stated the team does not have the family's permission.

===== Kansas City Chiefs =====
In 1963 the Kansas City Chiefs adopted their name when the Dallas Texans (AFL) relocated. "Chiefs" was not a direct reference to Native Americans, but to the nickname of Kansas City mayor Harold Roe Bartle, who was instrumental in bringing the Texans to Kansas City, Missouri. Bartle took his nickname as founder of Tribe of Mic-O-Say, a Boy Scouts honor camping society, in which he was "Chief" Lone Bear. In spite of attempts to downplay Native American associations, fan behavior such as the tomahawk chop and wearing face paint and headdresses drew criticism.

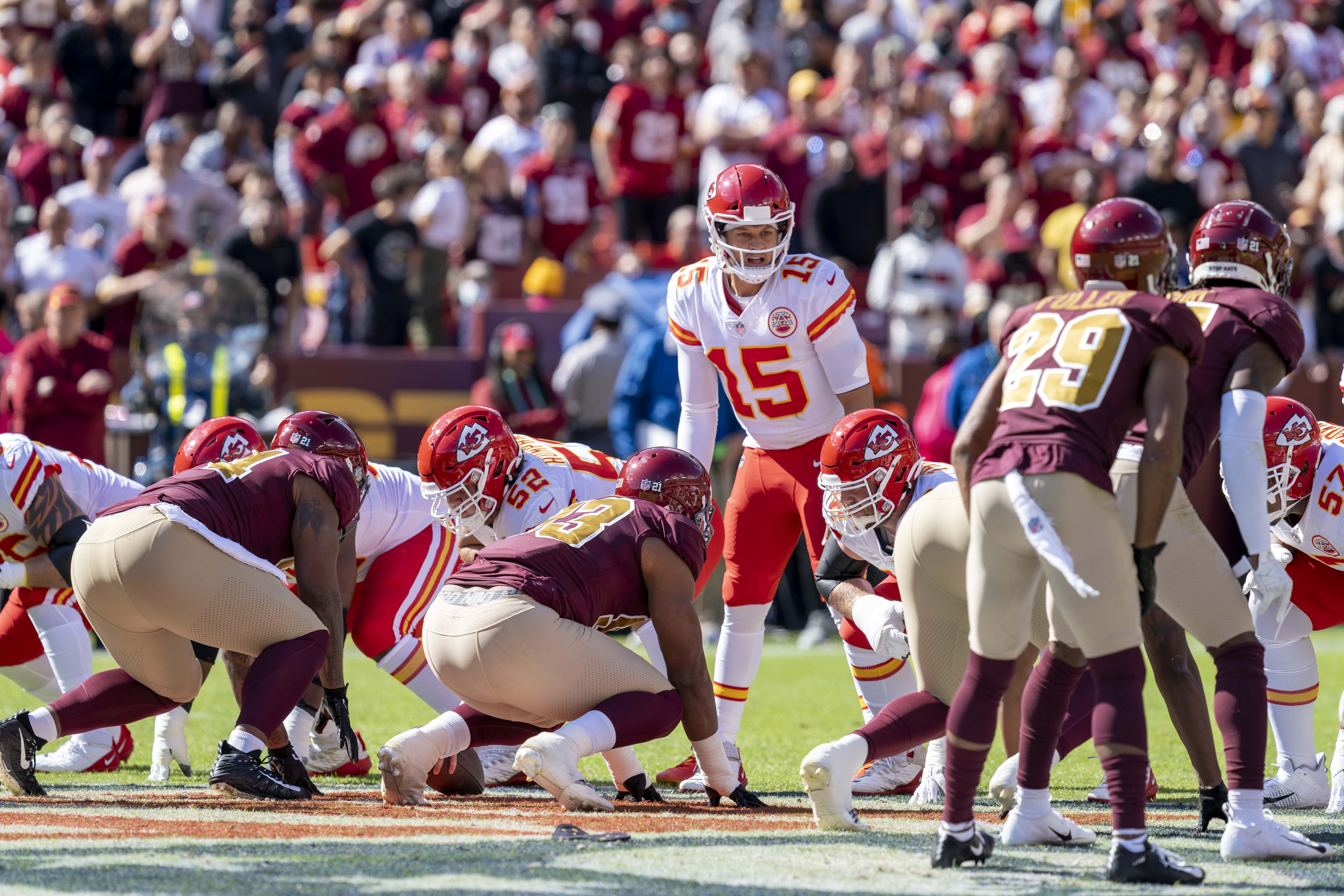
Kansas City Chiefs vs. Washington Football Team in 2021. Washington eliminated all Native American imagery from its temporary franchise name while Kansas City continues to use the "Chiefs" branding.

The Kansas City Chiefs tomahawk chop has been described by the Native American group Not In Our Honor as synchronized racism.

On August 20, 2020, the Chiefs announced that headdresses and Native American–style face paint would be banned at Arrowhead Stadium. The ban went into effect during the 2020 season opener on September 10, 2020. The tomahawk chop also underwent a subtle modification, as Arrowhead-based cheerleaders are now required to lead the chop with a closed fist rather than the traditional open palm. While fans said they will not change their behavior, a Native activist said that the chop should be eliminated. The appearance of the chop in Super Bowl LV focused attention on the Chiefs in 2021 to follow the example set by Washington, Cleveland, and many high schools. A group of two dozen Native Americans from Florida, Kansas City and elsewhere protested in front of the stadium on game day.

==== Prior usage ====
Several teams changed when they moved to other cities, while others went out of business. The Atlanta Hawks were originally the Tri-Cities Blackhawks (using an "Indian" logo), and the Los Angeles Clippers were originally the Buffalo Braves.

The United States national rugby league team was known as the Tomahawks until 2015. USA Rugby League replaced the American National Rugby League as the sport's governing body in the U.S. and chose the simpler Hawks as the new name for the team.

===== Cleveland Indians =====
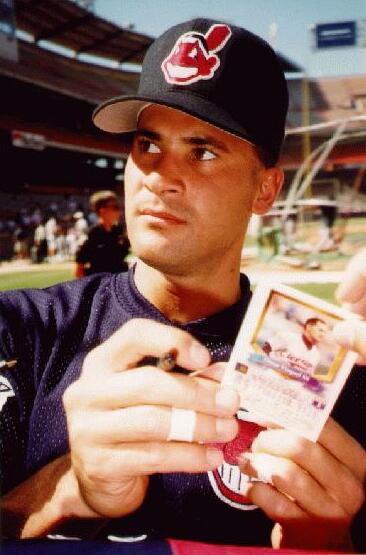
Cleveland Indians player Omar Vizquel wearing a baseball cap showing the image of Chief Wahoo in 1996

On March 21, 2018, the Baseball Hall of Fame in Cooperstown, New York, enacted a ban on Chief Wahoo being featured on future Hall of Fame plaques. This ban immediately went into effect with new Hall of Fame inductee Jim Thome, who was inducted as an Indian without Chief Wahoo's image. Starting in the 2019 season, the Chief Wahoo logo did not appear on uniforms nor on stadium signs, although it was still licensed for team merchandise within the Cleveland area. However, merchandise with Chief Wahoo's image was removed from the team's website. Local groups said they would continue to advocate for a change of the team name, and objected to the continued sale outside the stadium of merchandise with the Wahoo image.

On July 23, 2021, the ball club announced the name would change to the Cleveland Guardians at the end of the 2021 season. The new name was selected with reference to the Guardians of Traffic statues that adorn the Hope Memorial Bridge. The name change was made official on November 19, 2021.

===== Edmonton Eskimos =====
In part because they did not use any native imagery, the Edmonton Eskimos were rarely mentioned with regard to the controversy. However Natan Obed, the President of Inuit Tapiriit Kanatami, Canada's national Inuit organization, said in 2015 that "Eskimo is not only outdated, it is now largely considered a derogatory term" and is a "relic of colonial power". The editorial board of the Toronto Star in 2017 saw a name change as the inevitable result of social evolution, and reflecting respect for Indigenous peoples. After a year of considering alternatives, the team decided in February 2020 to retain the name, finding no consensus among Indigenous groups including the Inuit. However, on July 16, 2020, it was reported that the club would drop the 'Eskimos' name. On July 21, the team officially retired the name, and began using "Edmonton Football Team" and "EE Football Team" until a new name was decided. On June 1, 2021, the team was renamed to the Edmonton Elks.

===== Golden State Warriors =====
The Golden State Warriors removed Native American imagery as the team relocated. Originally the Philadelphia Warriors (1946–1962), their logo was a cartoon Native American dribbling a basketball. When they moved to San Francisco, the logo became a Native American headdress (1962–1968). The Warriors relocated a second time (to Oakland, California) in 1971, at which point they ceased using any Native American imagery. The Warriors returned to San Francisco in 2019.

===== Washington Redskins =====
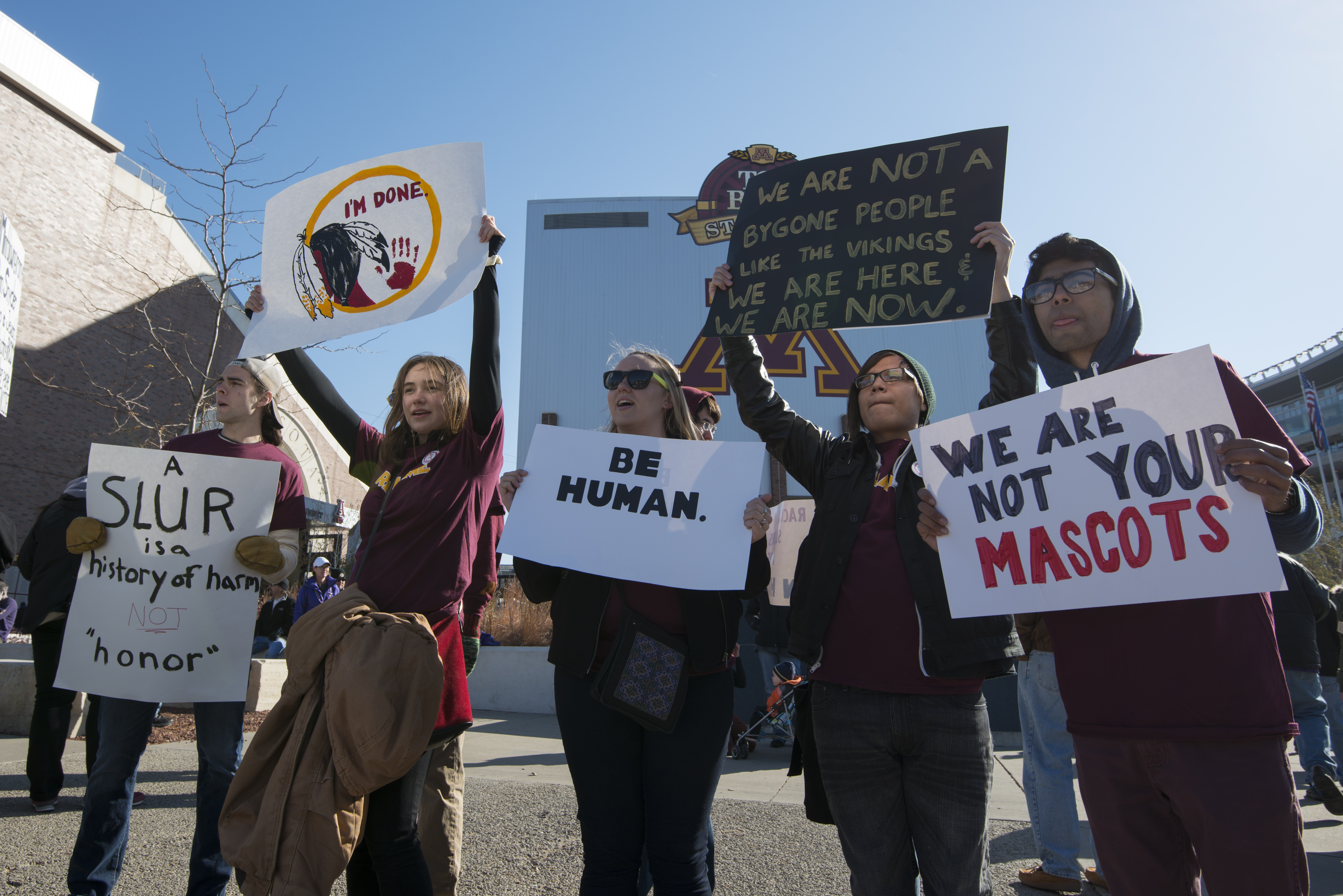
Protest against the name of the Washington Redskins in Minneapolis, Minnesota, November 2014

While playing as the Washington Redskins, the Washington Commanders received the most public attention due to the prominence of the team being located in the nation's capital, and the name itself being defined in current dictionaries of American English as "usually offensive", "disparaging", "insulting", and "taboo". Native American opposition to the name began in the early 1970s with letters to the owner of the team and the editors of The Washington Post. National protests began in 1988, after the team's Super Bowl XXII victory, and again when the 1992 Super Bowl between the Redskins and the Buffalo Bills was held in Minnesota. Those officially censuring or demanding the name be changed include more than 80 organizations that represent various groups of Native Americans.

In July 2020, amidst the removal of many names and images as part of the George Floyd protests, a group of investors worth $620 billion wrote letters to major sponsors Nike, FedEx and PepsiCo encouraging pressure on the Redskins to change their name. FedEx called on the team to change its name on July 2, 2020. The same day, Nike removed Redskins apparel from its website. On July 3, the league and the franchise announced that it was "undergoing a thorough review of the team name." On July 7, it was acknowledged that the Redskins were not in contact with a group of Native Americans who petitioned the NFL to force a name change and that Redskins head coach Ron Rivera also stated the team wanted to continue "honoring and supporting Native Americans and our Military." On July 13, 2020, the team made an official statement that their review would result in the retirement of the Redskins name and logo. On July 23, 2020, the team announced that they would be called the Washington Football Team with a block "W" logo for the 2020 season. The new name, Washington Commanders, was selected on February 2, 2022.

In 2026 the Commanders presented an alternate logo which featured a spear through its "W", indicating that it represents "joining the past with the present". The Association on American Indian Affairs responded that this was "disappointing and inappropriate".

== Other issues ==
=== Stereotyping by rival fans ===
In addition to the behavior displayed by some fans of the teams with Native American names or mascots, their rival fans often invoke racist stereotypes. In December 2013, when the Washington Redskins played the Kansas City Chiefs, an employee of a Sonic Drive-In in Missouri placed a message outside that used scalping, reservations and whiskey to disparage the "Redskins". It was quickly removed with the owner's apologies. A rubber severed "Indian" head impaled on a knife has been used by a sports fan in Philadelphia to taunt rival teams with Native American mascots. There have been a number of incidents of rival high school teams displaying banners or signs referencing the Trail of Tears, which have been criticized for both insensitivity and ignorance of history. Although the Central Michigan Chippewas have the support of the Saginaw Chippewa Tribal Nation of Michigan, a student at rival Western Michigan University designed a T-shirt showing a Native American behind bars with the legend "Caught a Chippewa about a week ago". It was quickly condemned by both university presidents, who agreed that anyone wearing the shirt at a game would be ejected.

=== Varying degrees of offensiveness ===
To further complicate this controversy, many feel that there are varying levels of offensiveness with team names and mascots. The nature and degree of stereotyping varies depending on the name of the team, the logo, the mascot, and the behavior of fans. The greatest offense is taken when the logo and mascot are caricatures viewed as insulting, such as the Cleveland Indians' Chief Wahoo; the name of the team is often regarded as a racial slur, such as Redskins or Squaws, or the behavior of the mascot or fans is based upon popular images of Indians which trivialize authentic native cultures, such as the tomahawk chop.

The practices of individual schools and teams have changed in response to the controversy. A local example is Washington High School in Sioux Falls, South Dakota. Many Native American images have been removed, and the "Warriors" nickname is now claimed to be generic. The school now has a "circle of courage" logo with eagle feathers and has also "updated" the murals of Chief Hollow Horn Bear in the gym. Duane Hollow Horn Bear, the chief's great-grandson, who teaches Lakota language and history at Sinte Gleska University in Mission, stated: "We had no objection to their utilizing those pictures as long as my great-grandfather was represented with honor and dignity." However, not all Native Americans are happy with the presence of any such images.

=== Teams outside North America ===
Native American names and images are used by teams in other countries, generally those playing American-style sports and copying the imagery of American teams. Several are in countries that also have a tradition of Native American hobbyists often associated with the popularity of the stories written by German author Karl May. In South America there are a number of teams that reference the Guaraní people. In Brazil, these teams may be referred to using the derogatory term bugre.

== See also ==
- List of ethnic sports team and mascot names (all ethnicities)
- Midget § Mascots (Slur against People with Dwarfism)
- Fighting Over Sioux, 2020 documentary
- Fighting Whites
- Pekin Community High School District 303 § Mascot controversy - Pekin "Chinks" (anti-Asian racial slur)
- Redwashing
- Religious symbolism in U.S. sports team names and mascots
