= Redskin =

Pejorative slang term for Native Americans

Redskin is a slang term for Native Americans in the United States and First Nations in Canada. The term redskin underwent pejoration through the 19th to early 20th centuries and in contemporary dictionaries of American English, it is labeled as offensive, disparaging, or insulting. Although the term has almost disappeared from contemporary use, it remains in use as a sports team name. The most prominent was the NFL's Washington Redskins, who resisted decades of opposition before retiring the name in 2020 following renewed attention to racial justice in the wake of the murder of George Floyd and subsequent protests. While the usage by other teams has been declining steadily, 37 high schools in the United States continue to use the Redskins name. School administrators and alumni assert that their use of the name is honoring their local tradition and not insulting to Native Americans.

The origin of the choice of red to describe Native Americans in English is debated. While related terms were used in anthropological literature as early as the 17th century, labels based on skin color entered everyday speech around the middle of the 18th century. "At the start of the eighteenth century, Indians and Europeans rarely mentioned the color of each other's skins. By midcentury, remarks about skin color and the categorization of peoples by simple color-coded labels (red, white, black) had become commonplace."

== Red as a racial identifier ==
Documents from the colonial period indicate that the use of red as an identifier by Native Americans for themselves emerged in the context of Indian-European diplomacy in the southeastern region of North America, becoming common usage in the 1720s. Subsequently, variations of "red men" were adopted by Europeans, becoming a generic label for all Native Americans.

Linguistic evidence indicates that, while some tribes may have used red to refer to themselves during the pre-Columbian era based upon their origin stories, the general use of the term was in response to meeting people who called themselves white and their slaves black. The choice of red rather than other colors may have been due to cultural associations, rather than skin color. Red and white were a dichotomy that had pervasive symbolic meanings in southeastern Native cultures which was less prevalent among northern tribes. While there was occasional use of red in Native American-European diplomacy in the northeast, it was still rare there even after it had become common in the southeast. Instead, Indian was translated into the native languages there as "men", "real people", or "original people". Usage in the northeast region by Europeans may have been largely limited to descriptions of tribes such as the Beothuk of Newfoundland, whose practice of painting their bodies and possessions with red ochre led Europeans to refer to them as "Red Indians". The personification of the Americas was staged at Whitehall Palace in December 1613 by a dancer in The Somerset Masque wearing "a skin coat the colour of the juice of mulberries, on her head large round brims of many coloured feathers, and in the midst of it a small crown".

Early ethnographic writers used a variety of terms; olivastre (olive) by François Bernier (1684), rufus (reddish, ruddy) by Linnaeus (1758), kupferroth ("copper-red") by Blumenbach (1779), and eventually simply "red" by René Lesson (1847). Early explorers and later Anglo-Americans termed Native Americans "light-skinned", "brown", "tawny", or "russet", but not "red" prior to the 19th century. Many did not view Natives as distinctly different in color from themselves, and thus could be assimilated into colonial society, beginning with conversion to Christianity.

In the modern debate over sports teams with the name, Oklahoma News 4 asserted that Oklahoma should change its name. The name Oklahoma translates from Choctaw as 'red people' (okla 'people' + humma 'red'). However, humma has a number of possible meanings in Choctaw, one of which is "humma, an addition to a man's name which gives him some distinction, calling on him for courage and honor." The name Oklahoma was created in 1866 by Principal Chief Allen Wright (Choctaw, 1826–1885). The Choctaw Nation of Oklahoma states that in the Choctaw language Okla means "people" and humma means "red."

== Origins of redskin in English ==
The first combination of red with skin, to form the term redskin, is dated to 1769 by Ives Goddard, linguist and curator emeritus in the Department of Anthropology of the National Museum of Natural History at the Smithsonian Institution. Goddard begins by pointing out that what had previously been considered the earliest English use of the term, a letter purported to have been written to an Englishman living in Hadley, Massachusetts in 1699, was spurious.

Goddard's alternative etymology is that the term emerged from the speech of Native Americans themselves, and that the origin and use of the term in the late 18th and early 19th century was benign. When it first appeared "it came in the most respectful context and at the highest level. ... These are white people and Indians talking together, with the white people trying to ingratiate themselves". The word later underwent a process of pejoration, by which it gained a negative connotation. Goddard suggests that redskin emerged from French translations of Native American speech in Illinois and Missouri territories in the 18th century. He cites as the earliest example a 1769 set of "talks", or letters, from chiefs of the Piankeshaw to Col. John Wilkins an English officer at Fort de Chartres. One letter included "si quelques peaux Rouges", which was translated as 'if any redskins', and the second included "tout les peaux rouges", which was translated as 'all the redskins'. The term here refers to warriors specifically. The term redskin enters wider English usage only in the first half of the 19th century. However, in an interview, Goddard admitted that it is impossible to verify whether the French translations of the Miami-Illinois language were accurate.

The term was used in an August 22, 1812, meeting between President James Madison and a delegation of chiefs from western tribes. There, the response of Osage chief "No Ears" (Osage: Tetobasi) to Madison's speech included the statement, "I know the manners of the whites and the red skins," while French Crow, principal chief of the Wahpekute band of Santee Sioux, was recorded as having said, "I am a red-skin, but what I say is the truth, and notwithstanding I came a long way I am content, but wish to return from here." However, while these usages may have been earliest, they may not have been disseminated widely. While the 1812 meeting with President Madison was contemporaneously recorded, the records were not published until 2004.

The earliest known appearance of the term in print occurred in multiple periodicals in October 1813 quoting a letter dated August 27, 1813. It concerned an expedition during the War of 1812 led by General Benjamin Howard against Indians in the Illinois and Mississippi territories: "The expedition will be 40 days out, and there is no doubt but we shall have to contend with powerful hordes of red skins ..."

Goddard suggests that a key usage was in a 20 July 1815 speech by Meskwaki Chief Black Thunder at the treaty council at Portage des Sioux, in which he is recorded as stating, "My Father – Restrain your feelings, and hear ca[l]mly what I shall say. I shall tell it to you plainly, I shall not speak with fear and trembling. I feel no fear. I have no cause to fear. I have never injured you, and innocence can feel no fear. I turn to all, red skins and white skins, and challenge an accusation against me." This speech was published widely, and Goddard speculates that it reached James Fenimore Cooper. In Cooper's novels The Pioneers (published in 1823) and The Last of the Mohicans (1826), both Native American and white characters use the term. These novels were widely distributed, and can be credited with bringing the term to "universal notice". The first time the term appears in Bartlett's "Dictionary of Americanisms" (in 1858), Goddard notes, the illustrative reference is to Last of the Mohicans.

Johnathan Buffalo, historic preservation director of the Meskwaki, said that in the 1800s redskins was used by the tribe for self-identification. Similarly, they identified others as "whiteskins" or "blackskins". Goddard's evidence for indigenous usage includes a 1914 phonetic transcription of the Meskwaki language in which both eesaawinameshkaata 'one with brown skin' and meeshkwinameshkaata 'one with red skin' were used to refer to Indians, while waapeshkinameshkaanichini 'one with white skin, white person' was used to refer to Europeans. However, the pre-contact Meskwaki use of red in identifying themselves did not refer to skin color, but to their origin stories as the "red-earth" people.

Historian Darren Reid of Coventry University states it is difficult for historians to document anything with certainty since Native Americans, as a non-literate society, did not produce the written sources upon which historians rely. Instead, what is cited as Native American usage was generally attributed to them by European writers. Any use of red in its various forms, including redskin, by Native Americans to refer to themselves reflected their need to use the language of the times in order to be understood by Europeans.

Sociologist James V. Fenelon makes a more explicit statement that Goddard's article is poor scholarship, given that the conclusion of the origin and usage by Natives as "entirely benign" is divorced from the socio-historical realities of hostility and racism from which it emerged.

=== Pejoration ===
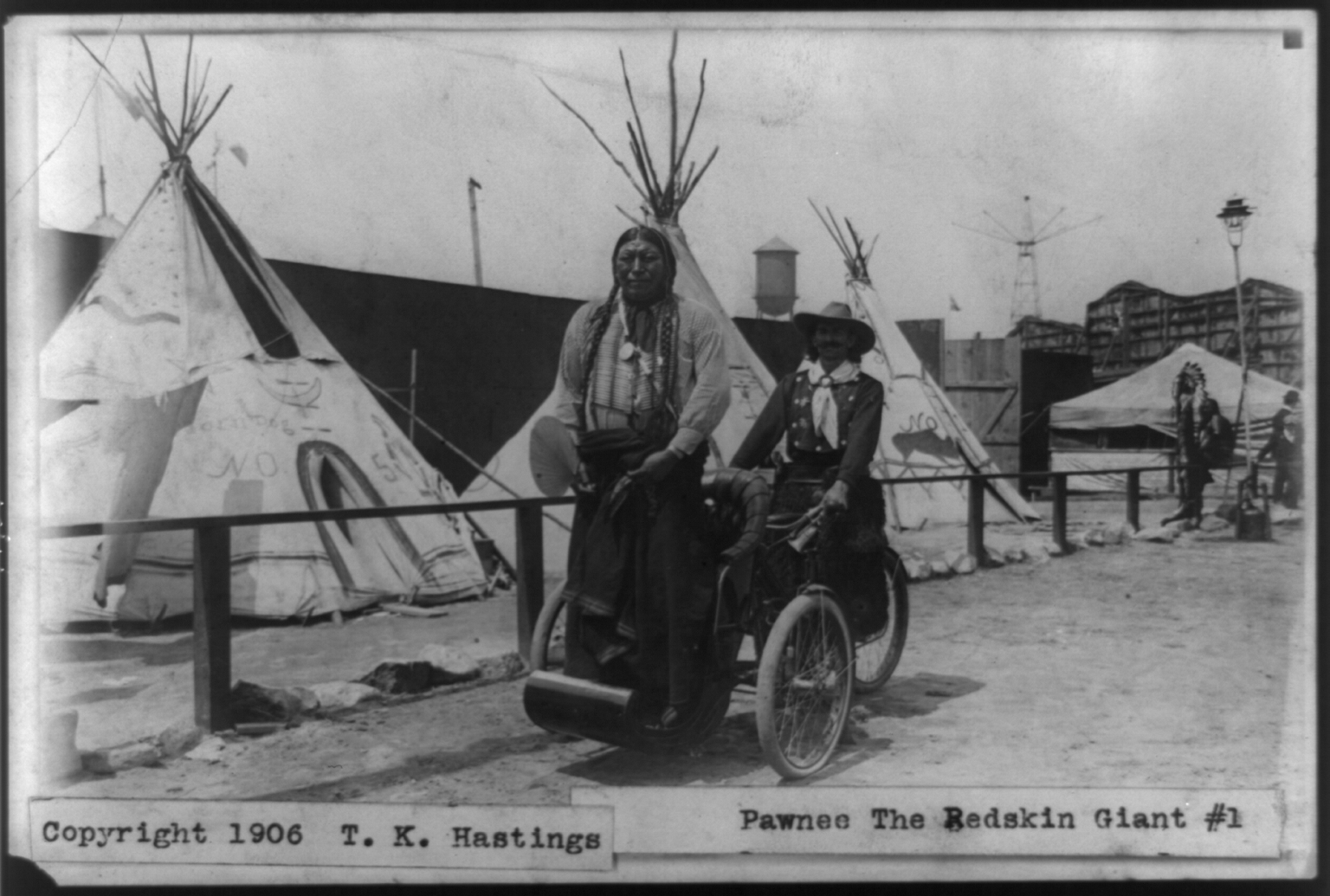
"Pawnee the Redskin Giant", 1906 photograph

The pejoration of the term redskin arguably begins as soon as its introduction in the early 19th century. A linguistic analysis of 42 books published between 1875 and 1930 found that negative contexts for the use of redskin were significantly more frequent than positive ones. However, the use of the word "Indian" in a similarly selected set of books was nearly the same, with more frequent negative than positive contexts, indicating that it was not the term "redskin" that was loaded pejoratively, but that its usage represents a generally negative attitude towards its referent. The word was first listed in Merriam-Webster's Collegiate Dictionary in 1898 as "often contemptuous."

Sociologist Irving Lewis Allen suggests that slang identifiers for ethnic groups based upon physical characteristics, including redskin, are by nature derogatory, emphasizing the difference between the speaker and the target. However, Luvell Anderson of the University of Memphis, in his paper "Slurring Words", argues that for a word to be a slur, the word must communicate ideas beyond identifying a target group, and that slurs are offensive because the additional data contained in those words differentiates those individuals from otherwise accepted groups.

Some Native American activists in the 21st century, in contradiction of the etymological evidence discussed above, assert that redskin refers directly to the bloody, red scalp or other body part collected for bounty. While this claim is associated in the media with litigants in the Washington Redskins trademark dispute; Amanda Blackhorse and Suzan Shown Harjo, the National Congress of American Indians' support indicates that the belief is widespread. Goddard denies any direct connection to scalping, and says there is a lack of evidence for the claim. C. Richard King argues that the lack of direct evidence for the assertion does not mean that those making the claim are "wrong to draw an association between a term that empathizes an identity based upon skin color and a history that commodified Native American body parts".

The term red-skin was, in fact used in conjunction with scalp hunting in the 19th century. In 1863 a Winona, Minnesota, newspaper, the Daily Republican, printed an announcement: "The state reward for dead Indians has been increased to $200 for every red-skin sent to Purgatory. This sum is more than the dead bodies of all the Indians east of the Red River are worth." A news story published by the Atchison Daily Champion in Atchison, Kansas, on October 9, 1885, tells of the settlers' "hunt for redskins, with a view of obtaining their scalps", worth $250. In his early career as the owner of a newspaper in South Dakota, L. Frank Baum wrote an editorial upon the death of Chief Sitting Bull in which he advocates the annihilation of all remaining redskins in order to secure the safety of white settlers, and because "better that they die than live the miserable wretches that they are."

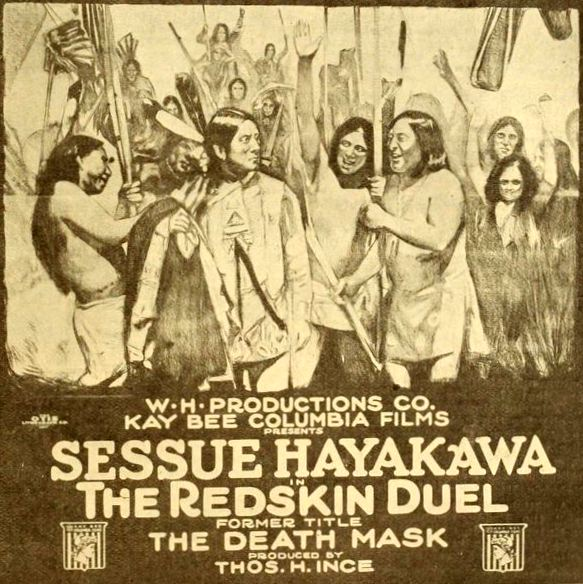
The Redskin Duel, 1914 silent film. The Native American roles were played by Native and Japanese actors.

When Hollywood westerns were most popular, roughly 1920–1970, the term redskins was often used to refer to Native Americans when war was imminent or in progress. In the Washington Redskins trademark dispute, the main issue was the meaning of the term in the period when the trademark registrations were issued, 1967–1990. The linguistic expert for the petitioner, Geoffrey Nunberg, successfully argued that whatever its origins, redskins was a slur at that time based upon passages from books and newspapers and movie clips, in which the word is inevitably associated with contempt, derision, condescension, or sentimental paeans to the noble savage. John McWhorter, an associate professor of linguistics at Columbia University, had compared the evolution of the name into a slur to that of other racial terms such as Oriental which also acquired implied meanings associated with contempt.

== Current use ==
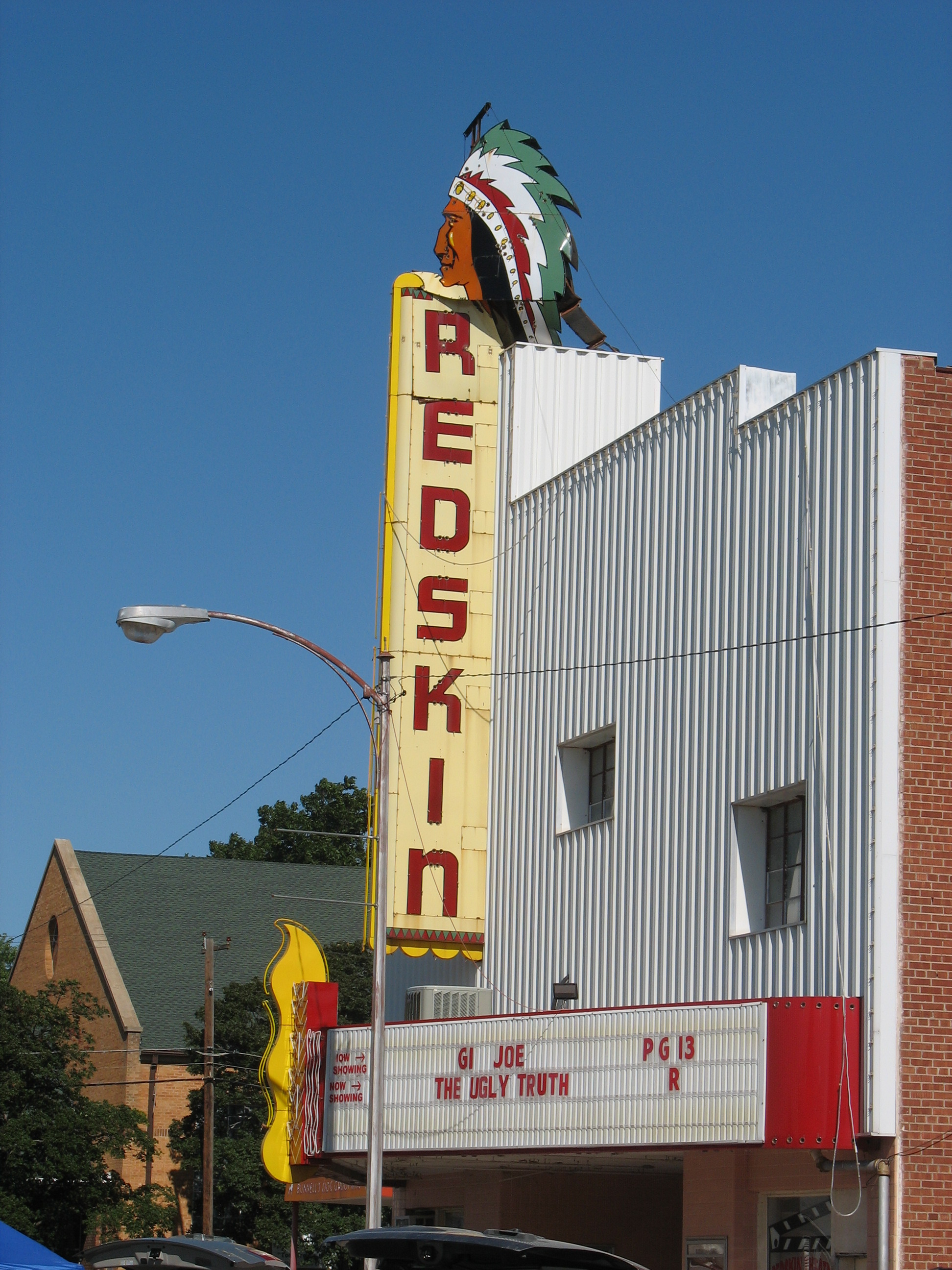
The Redskin Theater in Anadarko, Oklahoma. The town proclaims itself to be the "Indian Capital of the Nation", and its population is 41% Native American.

In the United States, redskin is regarded as a racial epithet by some, but as neutral by others, including some Native Americans. The American Heritage style guide advises that "the term redskin evokes an even more objectionable stereotype" than the use of red as a racial adjective by outsiders, while others urge writers to use the term only in a historical context. In modern dictionaries of American English it is labeled "usually offensive", "disparaging", "insulting", or "taboo".

=== Use among Native Americans ===
Three predominantly Native American schools use the name for their athletic teams, two of which serve reservations: Red Mesa High School in Teec Nos Pos, Arizona where the student body is 99% Navajo, and Wellpinit High School in Wellpinit, Washington, on the Spokane Indian Reservation. The principal of Red Mesa said in 2014 that use of the word outside American Indian communities should be avoided because it could perpetuate "the legacy of negativity that the term has created." In 2014, Wellpinit High School voted to keep the Redskins name. Native American writer and attorney Gyasi Ross compares Native American use of variations of the word Redskin with African-American use of variations of the word nigger. Use of these terms by some members of minority communities does not mean that these words may be used by outsiders. Ross also notes that while activism on the issue may be from a minority of Native Americans, this is due to most being concerned with more immediate issues, but also says "The presentation of the name 'Redskins' is problematic for many Native Americans because it identifies Natives in a way that the vast majority of Natives simply don't identity ourselves."

=== Sports teams ===
Numerous civil rights, educational, athletic, and academic organizations consider any use of native names/symbols by non-native sports teams to be a harmful form of ethnic stereotyping which should be eliminated.

==== Washington Redskins ====
The R-word is the moral equivalent of the N-word. It packs the same level of bigotry and insensitivity for Native Americans as any other racial slur. We cannot tolerate the NFL’s continued commitment to normalizing this demeaning characterization of Native Americans. The success of the Washington football franchise does not depend on the name of its team, but rather the talent of its players and leadership. The NFL must abandon its tone-deaf culture as it relates to people of color and change the hurtful name of this team.

— Marc H. Morial, President and CEO of the National Urban League

The controversy regarding Native mascots in general, and use of the name Redskins, was most prominent in the name used by the Washington National Football League team from 1933 to 2020. Public protest of the name began in 1968, with a resolution by the National Congress of American Indians. Native American groups and their supporters argue that since they view the word redskin as offensive, it is inappropriate for an NFL team to continue to use it, regardless of whether any offense is intended.

After decades of opposition to the name of the team by Native Americans, major sponsors responded to opponents of systemic racism in the wake of the murder of George Floyd. FedEx, Nike, and PepsiCo advocated changing the name. On July 3, 2020, Washington owner Daniel Snyder and team management announced a process of review of the name. On July 13, 2020, the team made an official statement that their review would result in the retirement of the Redskins name and logo. The new name, Washington Commanders was announced on February 2, 2022.

===== Public opinion =====
The meaning of the term redskin was directly relevant to the controversy, with supporters pointing to public opinion polls. Both a 2004 poll by the Annenberg Public Policy Center at the University of Pennsylvania, and a May 2016 poll by The Washington Post produced the same results, that 90% of the self-identified Native American respondents were "not bothered" by the team's name. However, in a commentary published soon after the 2004 poll, fifteen Native American scholars collaborated on a critique that stated that there were so many flaws in the Annenberg study that rather than being a measure of Native American opinion, it was an expression of white privilege and colonialism. Similar objections were made after the 2016 poll, mainly with regard to the use of self-identification to select Native American respondents.

A 2020 study at UC Berkeley which found that 49% of self-identified Native Americans responded that the Washington Redskins name was offensive or very offensive, while only 38% were not bothered by it. In addition, for study participants who were heavily engaged in their native or tribal cultures, 67% said they were offended, for young people 60%, and those with tribal affiliations 52%. These results are similar to that found in a study by the Center for Indigenous Peoples Studies at California State University, San Bernardino. A survey of 400 individuals, with 98 individuals positively identified as Native Americans, found that 67% agreed with the statement that redskins is offensive and racist. The response from non-natives was almost the opposite, with 68% responding that the name is not offensive.

===== Trademark case =====
On June 18, 2014, the Trademark Trial and Appeal Board (TTAB) of the United States Patent and Trademark Office (USPTO) cancelled the six trademarks held by the team in a two-to-one decision that held that the term redskins is disparaging to a "substantial composite of Native Americans", and this is demonstrated "by the near complete drop-off in usage of 'redskins' as a reference to Native Americans beginning in the 1960s". Evidence of disparagement submitted by the petitioners in the TTAB case include the frequent references to "scalping" made by sportswriters for sixty years when reporting the Redskins loss of a game, and passages from movies made from the 1940s to the 1960s using "redskin" to refer to Native Americans as a savage enemy. A linguistics expert for the team unsuccessfully argued that the name is merely a descriptive term no different than other uses of color to differentiate people by race. The linguistic expert for the petitioners, Geoffrey Nunberg, argued that whatever its origins, redskins was a slur at the time of the trademark registrations, based upon the passages from books and newspapers and movie clips, in which the word is inevitably associated with contempt, derision, condescension, or sentimental paeans to the noble savage. Although the USPTO decision was upheld upon appeal, on June 19, 2017, the Supreme Court of the United States ruled in another case, Matal v. Tam, that the disparagement clause of the Lanham Act violated the First Amendment's Free Speech Clause. Both the Native American petitioners and the Justice Department withdrew from any further litigation, the legal issue being moot.

==== College and secondary school teams ====
College teams that formerly used the name changed voluntarily; the University of Utah became the Utah Utes in 1972, Miami University (of Ohio) became the RedHawks in 1997 and Southern Nazarene University became the Crimson Storm in 1998.

The number of high schools using the Redskins name has been in steady decline (some of which closed or merged), with 36 remaining. In a survey conducted in 2013, 40% had local efforts to change the name, while 28 high schools in 18 states had done so. By December 2017, the number of high school "Redskins" had continued to decline from 62 to 49, including four affected by a 2015 California law. In 2019, Teton High School in Idaho and in March 2020 Paw Paw High School in Michigan retired the name. The rate of change increased following the decision by the Washington Football Team, Anderson High School in Ohio and Clinton Community Schools in Michigan changing immediately, followed by La Veta High School in Colorado., Union High School (Tulsa, Oklahoma), Wichita North High School, Cuyahoga Heights High School in Ohio and Saranac High School in Saranac, Michigan. In April, 2022 the Sandusky Community Schools Board of Education voted to retire its mascot at the end of the school year. In June 2024, the Oriskany, New York high school mascot became the Skyhawks.

Some communities have been sharply divided, with long-term residents seeking to keep the mascot while newcomers being open to change. In Driggs, Idaho, the deciding factor was the participation of local tribes advocating change. Other school districts made changes with little opposition. The school board for Cuyahoga Heights Ohio voted unanimously to retire their mascot following the decision by the Cleveland Indians to become the Guardians. The Wichita school board followed the recommendations of a committee appointed to examine the issue.

== See also ==
- Historical race concepts
- Stereotypes of indigenous peoples of Canada and the United States
