= Washington Redskins Original Americans Foundation =

Nonprofit organization in the United States

The Washington Redskins Original Americans Foundation was a nonprofit organization started by Daniel Snyder, controlling owner of the Washington Redskins, an American football team in the National Football League (NFL). It was formed in 2014 under a climate of controversy around the name of the team, which Native American organizations such as the National Congress of American Indians consider offensive. According to a letter from Snyder, it "will address the urgent challenges plaguing Indian country based on what tribal leaders tell us they need most." In the letter to season ticket holders, announcing the Foundation, Snyder stated that he and other team representatives had visited 26 reservations in twenty states to "listen and learn first-hand about the views, attitudes, and experiences of the Tribes". The letter quotes Pueblo of Zuni Governor Arlen Quetawki, saying "I appreciated your sincerity to learn about our culture and the real life issues we face on a daily basis". Torrez-Martinez of Desert Cahuilla was quoted in the letter as saying, "There are Native Americans everywhere that 100 percent support the Redskins". Snyder also used his letter to cite instances of support for the team name by other Native Americans during his visits.

After decades of defending the name, amidst the removal of many names and images as part of the George Floyd protests, and pressure from investors and sponsors, the Redskins began the process of changing their name. On July 23, 2020 the team announced that, given that a rebranding will take 12 to 18 months, they would be called the Washington Football Team with a block "W" logo for the 2020 season. In September 2020 the foundation was renamed Washington Football Team Original Americans Foundation, but in November 2020 the team announced that it would no longer have any connection to the foundation. On February 2, 2022, the new team name, Washington Commanders, was announced.

== Background ==
Prior to the official announcement of the foundation, there had been news reports of meetings by Snyder with tribal leaders in Alabama and New Mexico to discuss charitable donations and economic development; which received mixed responses from Native Americans. Some welcome any assistance with poverty and the other problems poverty creates; while others see it as purely public relations. Robert McGhee, treasurer of the Poarch Band of Creek Indians in Atmore, AL said: "I thought the whole meeting was odd." On his visit to the A:shiwi A:wan Museum and Heritage Center in New Mexico, Snyder was given a guided tour by the director, Jim Enote. When Enote told Snyder he was not pleased with the Redskins mascot and team name Snyder snapped back with, "We are a football team."

Gary L. Edwards (Cherokee), the chief executive of the National Native American Law Enforcement Association (NNALEA) was named director of OAF. As CEO of NNALEA, Edwards serves or has served on the following advisory committees and task forces: the National Incident Management System; the National Response Plan; the Funding of First Responders; Preparedness and Information Sharing; Pilot Capabilities Assessment Project; SAFECOM Advisory Group; the Department of Homeland Security's National Preparedness Goal State, Tribal and Local Working Group; as well as the Department of Justice's Counter-Terrorism Training Coordination Working Group, Intelligence Training Coordination Working Group and Officer Safety and Wellness Task Force. The NNALEA was cited in a US Dept. of Interior Inspector General's (IG) report for failing to produce any usable work to fulfill a contract with the Bureau of Indian Affairs, leading to cancellation of that contract. Edwards was not mentioned by name. The IG report was most critical of the BIA for allowing language in the contract that resulted in the NNALEA being paid almost $1 million without requiring results. A number of female employees accused Edwards of sexual harassment, and said that they received expensive gifts from him purchased with foundation funds.

== Reception and criticism ==
NFL Commissioner Roger Goodell stated that he takes the creation of the foundation as an indication that Snyder is "doing his due diligence when it comes to listening to the public about the franchise's controversial name, and he continues to stand behind the name due to strong public support."

The National Congress of American Indians issued a statement saying it is glad that Snyder is dedicating time and resources to Native American issues. "However, this Foundation will only contribute to the problems in Indian Country if it does not also address the very real issue of how Native people are consistently stereotyped, caricatured, and denigrated by mascot imagery and the use of the R-word slur," the statement read. "For Mr. Snyder and the Foundation to truly support and partner with Indian Country, they must first change the name of the D.C. team and prove that the creation of this organization isn't just a publicity stunt." In an editorial in the Washington Post, Brian Cladoosby, the president of the NCAI wrote: "Snyder, his team and the NFL are welcome to join Indian country as allies and partners but only when they make their most significant contribution up front: Retire the name of this team. Only then will we truly know Snyder's commitment to Indian country, to Native youth and to a future where tribal nations and our people are treated as equal to all other Americans." The initial critical responses to the foundation from some Native American advocates was almost overshadowed in the media by the response to Stephen Colbert's attempt at satire.

In response to the foundation, ESPN commentator Keith Olbermann asked why, if "Redskin" is not insulting, Snyder never uses the term to refer to Native Americans? Senator Harry Reid called the foundation "a phony deal" and predicted that the name will change within three years. In a letter posted on her website, Congresswoman Betty McCollum (D-Minn.) calls the foundation an "attempt to buy the silence of Native Americans with a foundation that is equal parts public relations scheme and tax deduction." In The New York Times, author David Treuer (Ojibwe) places the creation of the foundation in the context of the long history of Native American being given gifts rather than real change that would make a difference.

In an editorial Rick Cohen, a former executive director of the National Committee for Responsive Philanthropy (NCRP) notes that there are signs that any assistance given to Native Americans will be contingent on silence, if not support of the team name by the recipients. Also, the creation of a new foundation, by joining the team name with Native Americans, is an obvious public relations tactic, since both Snyder and the team have existing charitable foundations which could have made contributions to existing Native American organizations. Diana Aviv, president and CEO of Independent Sector, a leadership organization representing nonprofits, foundations and corporate grant makers, criticized the Washington NFL team's Original Americans Foundation stating: "Creating a new foundation using the language found in the Washington NFL team's name is offensive not only to Native communities, but to all people of goodwill who believe it is important to treat others with respect and dignity". The Joint Affinity Groups and Native Americans in Philanthropy have issued a statement that the OAF's "laudable philanthropic goals are undermined by the continued use of a racist slur in the name of the foundation and the franchise that founded it", and asks "Is it exploitive to offer funds or other financial benefits to under-served tribal communities in exchange for tacit permission to continue using that identifiably racist/stereotypic mascot term?"

Redskins general manager Bruce Allen responded to the criticism by saying the foundation is not intended to buy support.

== Funded projects and results ==
For recipients of one of the initial donations, the Lame Deer, Montana public schools on the Northern Cheyenne Indian Reservation, there is a range of opinion regarding the name of the Washington team, but the tribe's Economic development administrator Steve Small, said "We had to weigh need against principle." The publisher of the reservation newspaper called the foundation "...a slick PR move to gain support from poor Native Americans to keep the Redskins mascot. It's cheaper than changing the brand name and commerce associated with the current mascot and logo."

Upon learning that the OAF would be the title sponsor of a celebrity golf tournament in Arizona, two of the other sponsors withdrew their participation in protest. First was the National Indian Gaming Association, whose chairman, Ernest Stevens, said his organization finds the NFL team's name to be offensive and is skeptical about the motives of the foundation". Next was the Notah Begay III Foundation, its executive director Crystal Echo Hawk stating: "I find it underhanded and despicable that the Washington football team would co-opt this event. As soon as we found out about their involvement we withdrew our support." Later, an additional sponsor, the Navajo Nation Gaming Enterprise, stated that they would have declined sponsorship had they known in advance of the Redsk*ns involvement. After the event, the Navajo Nation President Ben Shelly thanked the sponsors and expressed disappointment at those who had withdrawn support.

Members of the Fort Yuma Quechan Tribe say they refused a "bribe" from the Washington Redskins organization, which tribal members say offered a blank check to fund a skatepark in their community. The Quechan Memorial Skatepark is an existing project intended to provide an activity for young people, while serving as a memorial to those lost to suicide.

The Chippewa Cree Tribe of Montana accepted money from the foundation to build a playground, leaders stating that they do not care about the controversy.

The Zuni Pueblo tribe sent notice to Native artists that representatives of the OAF would be visiting on August 11, 2014 to buy artwork, in particular anything that incorporated the team logo or colors. The director of the Zuni Museum and Heritage Center characterized the event as part of a "spin doctoring" campaign, and wondered why the purchases would not be made through the existing markets for Zuni artworks.

According to a report filed with the IRS, the OAF donated $3.7 million to 20 tribes during 2014, its first year of operation. The amount dropped to 1.6 million in the second year, with no explanation being given. However, the team has spent at least a half a million dollars lobbying Congress regarding the foundation since 2014.

== Current status ==
It has been noted that there has been no reports of activity by the foundation in the first months of 2015, and references to the OAF have disappeared from the main website of the team. The chairwoman of the Paiute Indian Tribe of Utah, Gari Pikyavit Lafferty, has been removed from office by a majority vote of the tribal council for accepting personal gifts in exchange for her support of the OAF and the Redskins team name. Lafferty's subsequent appeal of her impeachment has been denied. Phil Gover, a member of the Paiute tribe and one of the petitioners in the case that cancelled the Redskins trademarks, states that the foundation is having a corrupting influence. In August, 2015, the Cheyenne River Sioux Council in South Dakota voted to return a $25,000 check issued to the Cheyenne River Rodeo Association on July 10, and decline any further donations from the Original Americans Foundation. After accepting a $200,000 donation for the prior year, the Indian National Finals Rodeo (INFR), which says it is the U.S.' and Canada's largest rodeo organization for Native Americans, sent a letter refusing any further donations. INFR Vice President Michael Bo Vocu stated "After much soul searching, we have decided that we cannot in good conscience accept resources from you on the terms you have offered, no matter how desperately we need it ... because, as you know, the resources you are offering are not truly philanthropic – they come with the expectation that we will support the racial slur that continues to promote your associated professional football team's name." Last year the Redskins primary logo appeared at many Native rodeo events, creating a backlash from those offended by it.

With the announcement in July, 2020 that the Redskins management is doing a review of the team name, Sports Illustrated investigated the foundation and found that funding was cut back after the resolution of the trademark cases in 2017. In addition, some of the funds that were spent went not to Native Americans, but to schools that also used Redskins as their sport team name, such as St. Johns High School in Arizona and McLoud High School in Oklahoma were Native Americans are only a minority of students, 7% and 13% respectively.

Soon after the team dropped the Redskins name, the foundation's charitable activity dwindled, and its corporate existence lapsed due to the failure to file reports to the Virginia State Corporation Commission. In September, 2020 the foundation was reinstated and the name was changed to Washington Football Team Original Americans Foundation. When a prior recipient of donations requested aid from the foundation to pay for COVID-19 testing, the request was denied. In October, the team said it had decided to no longer sponsor the foundation.

== In popular culture ==
Comedy Central aired a segment of The Colbert Report that attempted to satirize the establishment of the Washington Redskins Original Americans Foundation by proposing a foundation called the "Ching-Chong Ding-Dong Foundation for Sensitivity to Orientals or Whatever". The resulting campaign to "CancelColbert" by Asian Americans overshadowed the initial response from Native Americans opposed to the Redskins foundation.

== See also ==
- "Go Fund Yourself"
- Washington Redskins trademark dispute
