= Washington Redskins trademark dispute =

Former legal dispute to trademark the slur "Redskin"

The Washington Redskins trademark dispute was a legal effort to define the term "redskin" to be an offensive and pejorative racial slur to deprive the owners of the NFL's Washington Redskins of the ability to maintain federal trademark protection for the name. These efforts had primarily been carried forward in two cases brought before the U.S. Patent and Trademark Office (USPTO). While prevailing in the most recent case in which the trademarks were cancelled, petitioners withdrew for further litigation now that the legal issue has become moot due to a decision in another case which found the relevant portion of the trademark law to be an unconstitutional infringement on freedom of speech.

After decades of defending the name, amidst the removal of many names and images as part of the George Floyd protests combined with pressure from investors and sponsors, the Redskins began the process of changing their name. On July 23, 2020 the team announced that, given that a rebrand typically takes 12 to 18 months, they would be called the Washington Football Team with a block "W" logo for the 2020 and 2021 seasons.

The franchise underwent an extensive search for a new trademark and name, and announced its new branding as the Washington Commanders on February 2, 2022.

== Harjo case ==
The first action in the dispute occurred in 1992, when Suzan Shown Harjo, President of the Morning Star Institute, with six other prominent Native Americans represented by the Dorsey & Whitney law firm of Minneapolis, petitioned the USPTO to cancel the trademark registrations owned by the Redskins' corporate entity of Pro-Football, Inc. (now known as Pro-Football, LLC). They based their lawsuit on the claim that federal trademark law states that certain trademark registrations are not legal if they are "disparaging, scandalous, contemptuous, or disreputable." The legal battle went on for seven years. In 1999 the PTO judges canceled the federal registration of the mark REDSKINS "on the grounds that the subject marks may disparage Native Americans and may bring them into contempt or disrepute." The owners appealed the decision to a district court in the District of Columbia in Pro-Football, Inc. v. Harjo. The court reversed the USPTO's decision on the grounds of insufficient evidence of disparagement. Subsequent appeals have been rejected on the basis of laches, which means that the specific Native American plaintiffs had pursued their rights in an untimely and delayed manner. In 2009 the Supreme Court declined to take up the case.

== Related trademark actions ==
Since 1992, the USPTO has rejected eleven applications for other trademarks that included the word redskins, based on the same reason of disparagement. Some of the applications were made by Pro-Football, Inc., including "Washington Redskins Cheerleaders", some for other products. The USPTO rejected an application to register "Redskins Hog Rinds" because it "consists of or includes matter which may disparage or bring into contempt or disrepute persons, institutions, beliefs, or national symbols".

== Blackhorse case ==
A second case was filed, Blackhorse v. Pro-Football, Inc., with younger plaintiffs whose standing might not be hindered by laches. On June 18, 2014, the Trademark Trial and Appeal Board (TTAB) of the United States Patent and Trademark Office (USPTO) voted to cancel the six trademarks held by the team in a two-to-one decision that held that the term "redskins" is disparaging to a "substantial composite of Native Americans", and this is demonstrated "by the near complete drop-off in usage of 'redskins' as a reference to Native Americans beginning in the 1960s." The Trademark board asked two questions in determining disparagement: 1) what is the meaning of the mark as it appears in connection with the goods and services in the registrations and 2) is the meaning of the marks one that may be disparaging. The questions are to be answered in the context of the respective dates of registration of each mark.

Evidence of disparagement submitted by the petitioners in the case include the frequent references to "scalping" made by sportswriters for sixty years when reporting the Redskins loss of a game, and passages from movies made from the 1940s to the 1960s using "redskin" to refer to Native Americans as a savage enemy. A linguistics expert for the team unsuccessfully argued that the name is merely a descriptive term no different than other uses of color to differentiate people by race. The TTAB also found that the term "redskin" refers to Native Americans (rather than having an "independent meaning" as the team sometimes claimed) as shown by the costumes worn by both the cheerleaders and marching band from the 1960s until the 1980s, and the native imagery used on the press guides for many years.

In a press release the trademark attorney for the team stated that they were confident that they would once again prevail on appeal, and that today's decision will make no difference in the continued use of the Redskins name. Plaintiff Amanda Blackhorse, a social worker and member of the Navajo Nation, said in an interview, "We’ve been through this process for eight years now. We will continue to fight. And, you know, this is not the end for us." Some legal experts have opined that the ruling could stick this time.

The political columnist George Will portrayed the case as an example of overreach by government regulatory agencies, arguing that there was an "absence of general or Native American revulsion" toward the name. A sports columnist for The Washington Post compared the TTAB's actions to "policing speech". The cancellation of Federal registration in fact made no change to the team's use of the name, but withdrew the government from the responsibility to regulate the use of the name by anyone. The team retains other rights under common law, but must enforce them without government assistance. However, in the opinion of one intellectual property law firm, the team "may be hesitant to sue another for infringing its marks because of the risk that a court could possibly determine that the team has no protectable interest in the name because of its disparaging nature".

=== Appeal of Blackhorse decision ===
The Washington Redskins filed its appeal in the Blackhorse case on August 14, 2014, stating their belief "that the Trademark Trial and Appeal Board (TTAB) ignored both federal case law and the weight of the evidence". They also cite infringement of their First Amendment right to free expression. On September 22, 2014 the Native Americans asked that the team's appeal be dismissed because it names them as individuals, which is contrary to federal law, and because the appeal was filed with the U.S. District Court in Alexandria, VA, stating that the Redskins should have filed its case against the patent office in the U.S. Court of Appeals for the Federal Circuit in Washington, DC. In Oct, 2014 Judge Gerald B. Lee rejected the Native American plaintiffs' attempts to have the team's appeal dismissed. The United States Department of Justice entered the case in a limited way by stating that it will defend the constitutionality of the trademark law.

The ACLU filed an Amicus brief stating that while it found the name Redskins repellant, the government should not be able to decide what types of speech are forbidden, and that the provision of the Lanham Act barring the trademark of disparaging terms is unconstitutionally vague in its wording and has not been applied with consistency. On March 23, 2015, the Attorney General's Office filed a brief addressing the Constitutional issues, stating that as commercial speech, the team name and logo are not protected by the First Amendment, and that there is a large number of cases supporting the cancellation of the trademarks. The brief also stated that the court should also reject the claim that the cancellation of trademarks constitutes an illegal taking of valuable property which is barred by the Fifth Amendment. By opening up an inquiry into constitutional issues regarding limits on disparaging speech in order to protect "the unique cultural heritage" of the American Indian population, the case may go well beyond what a football team calls itself. The Navajo Nation filed an amicus curiae brief in support of the decision to cancel the trademarks, due to Pro-Football, Inc. stating in its appeal that individual members of the Navajo Nation such as former chairman Peter McDonald do not find the name disparaging. The brief states that these individuals speak only for themselves, while the tribe’s elected, appointed and traditional leaders speak for the Navajo people and present “unified opposition” to the team name because it is disparaging and has a negative psychological effect on tribal members.

On July 8, 2015, Judge Lee affirmed the decision of the Trademark Trial and Appeal Board. Judge Lee denied the team's summary judgment motions challenging the constitutionality of the Lanham Act and granted the Blackhorse Defendants' summary judgment motions, finding that "the evidence before the Court supports the legal conclusion that...the Redskin Marks consisted of matter that 'may disparage' a substantial composite of Native Americans." The decision does not bar the team from using the marks going forward, and the order itself is subject to further appeal.

Team president Bruce Allen expressed surprise at the decision, and that a summary judgement was made by the judge based upon the evidence submitted rather than proceeding to a trial. While the team continues to have certain rights to its trademarks, it must take action to protect those rights individually. The cancellation of federal registration of the trademarks means that the government will no longer take any action against anyone else using the name or logo, such as blocking counterfeit goods from being imported into the country.

On October 30, 2015 Pro-Football, Inc. filed its appeal with the United States Court of Appeals for the Fourth Circuit. In addition to maintaining the validity of all the arguments rejected by both the TTAB and the first appeal, the team has added a list of offensive names that have been given trademarks, thus claiming unequal treatment. The names cited as offensive are mainly sexual or scatological, but do include the racial terms "yid", "dago", "gringo" and "negro". Eighteen law professors have jointly filed an amicus brief in the case stating that the relevant section of the Lanham Act is an unconstitutional intrusion into freedom of expression, and rejecting the TTAB opinion that trademarks are government speech not protected by the first amendment. Ron Katz, sports attorney and Chair Emeritus of the Institute of Sports Law and Ethics at Santa Clara University, expects the team to win its appeal based upon constitutional grounds, while describing the trademark as "repugnant".

These cases prompted a range of opinions from law professors.

- Megan M. Carpenter, a professor and co-director of the Center for Law and Intellectual Property at the Texas A&M University School of Law: Trademark law should not be used to make moral decisions, which change over time, and notes that the law has been applied unevenly.
- Christine Haight Farley, a professor at American University Washington College of Law: A distinction should be made between trademarks and government registration. Protection of free speech may allow any trademark to be used, but registration places a seal of approval which should not be given to racist trademarks.
- Sonia Katyal, professor of law and faculty co-director of the Berkeley Center for Law and Technology at the University of California, Berkeley: A distinction should be made between a racially sensitive trademark being used ironically by the targets of racism in order to reclaim it, and one used offensively. In addition, denying registration is not limiting speech, since the trademark may be used without government protection.
- Ashutosh Bhagwat, professor of constitutional law at the University of California, Davis, School of Law: Banning any trademark is an unconstitutional violation of free speech protection.

== Supreme Court review ==
Both the USPTO and Pro-Football, Inc. requested a review by the Supreme Court of the United States (SCOTUS) of the same legal issue, the constitutionality of banning a disparaging trademark. The USPTO appealed the decision by the U.S. Court of Appeals for the Federal Circuit which found in December 2015 that part of the Lanham Act is unconstitutional. That case (Matal v. Tam) involved the denial of a trademark for an Asian-American rock band, "The Slants". The National Asian Pacific American Bar Association (NAPABA) filed an amicus brief supporting the constitutionality of the Lanham Act, NAPABA President Cyndie Chang stating “Racial slurs should not be recognized as commercial speech through federally-protected trademarks. "Freedom of speech does not require that the government allow racially derogatory terms to be trademarked so that a trademark owner can have exclusive rights to use and monetize such terms." On June 19, 2017 the court ruled unanimously in favor of Tam, the majority opinion stating "The disparagement clause violates the First Amendment's Free Speech Clause. Contrary to the Government’s contention, trademarks are private, not government speech." Both the Native American petitioners and the Justice Department have withdrawn from any further litigation now that the Supreme Court has rendered the legal issue moot.

While team owner Daniel Snyder expressed the opinion that the court decision was a victory for the team, the executive director of the NCAI asserted that the name remains a slur, and the decision that grants it First Amendment protection does not alter any of the arguments against its continued use.

== See also ==
- "Go Fund Yourself", a 2014 South Park episode referencing the dispute
