= Minimum high regard =

Minimum high regard is both a legal procedural, and a euphemistically disparaging, term of art, in the U. S. Senate. Its initial sense in that body is in a rule about speech among members, intended to ensure "comity" and mutual politeness in statements by them as part of formal sessions of that body. Nevertheless, it has been used with lawyerly but also lawyerish and thereby ironic insinuation as a term of disparagement, in effect flouting that very rule. The irony reflects the arguably ambiguous intent of "minimum", since tone or context easily connote, the presumably intended meaning of

"no less than what is obviously required",

but the ironic and significantly sarcastic,

"only to the insignificant degree, which the teethless rule pretends to be remotely capable of enforcing".
