= Shown =

Shown is an American surname that reflects an Anglicization of the German surname Schaun. A common variant is Shawn. Notable people with the surname include:

- Suzan Shown Harjo (born 1945), Native American activist
