= Washington Redskins name controversy =

Controversy involving the name and logo of the Washington Redskins NFL team

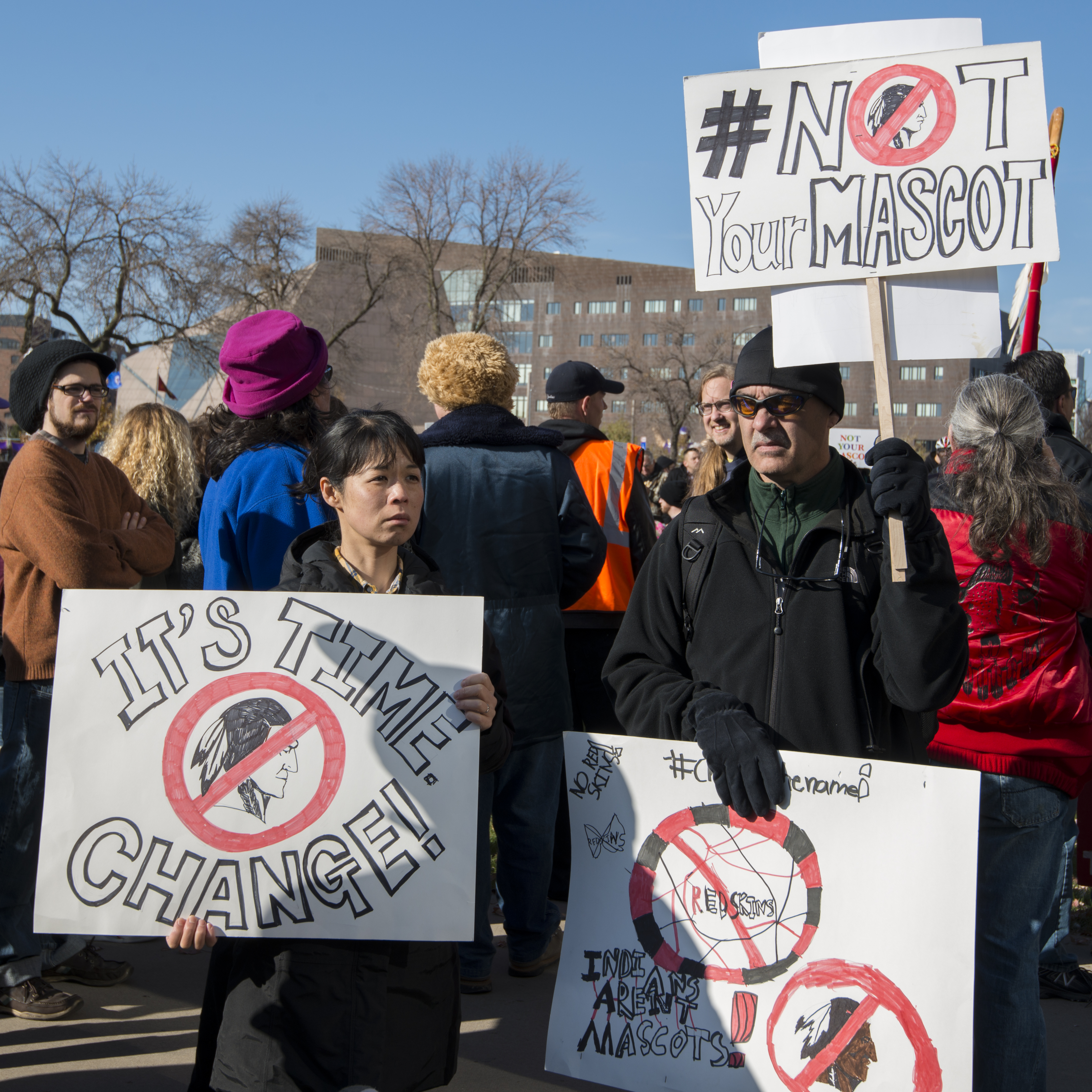
In November 2014, a demonstration against the "Redskins" name and logo was held outside TCF Bank Stadium in Minneapolis before a game against the Vikings.

The Washington Redskins name controversy involved the name and logo used from 1937 to 2020 by the Washington Commanders, a National Football League (NFL) team in the Washington metropolitan area. In the 1970s, the team's longtime name and logo began to draw criticism from Native American groups and individuals. The topic, part of the larger Native American mascot controversy, began receiving widespread public attention in the 1990s. In 2020, the team responded to economic pressure in the wake of the George Floyd protests by retiring the name and logo. The team called itself the "Washington Football Team" before rebranding as the Commanders in 2022.

"Redskin" is a pejorative slang term, considered by some a racial slur, for Native Americans in the United States and First Nations in Canada. The term redskin underwent pejoration in the 19th to early 20th centuries, and in contemporary dictionaries of American English it is labeled as offensive, disparaging, or insulting. The Cambridge Dictionary defines the word as "an extremely offensive word for a Native American (a member of one of the groups of people who were living in North and South America before Europeans arrived)".

For several decades, the team's owners and management, NFL commissioners, and most fans sought to keep the name, claiming that it honored the achievements and virtues of Native Americans and was not intended disparagingly. Then–team president Bruce Allen noted that three high schools with a Native American–majority student body used the name. Supporters also pointed to a 2004 Annenberg Public Policy Center poll that found that most Native Americans were not offended by the name. The use of public opinion polling methods to measure the opinions of a small, diverse population was criticized by scholars, in particular the use of self-identification to select the people surveyed. The name was opposed by the National Congress of American Indians, which said in 2013 that it represented 1.2 million people in its member tribes.

== Name change ==
In July 2020, amid the removal of many names and images as part of the George Floyd protests, a group of investors worth $620 billion wrote letters to major sponsors Nike, FedEx, and PepsiCo encouraging pressure on the Redskins to change their name. FedEx called on the team to change its name on July 2, 2020. The same day, Nike removed Redskins apparel from its website.

On July 3, the league and the franchise announced that it was "undergoing a thorough review of the team name". Amazon, Target, and Walmart then withdrew Redskins merchandise from their stores and websites. On July 7, it was acknowledged that the Redskins were not in contact with a group of Native Americans who petitioned the NFL to force a name change. Redskins head coach Ron Rivera said the team wanted to continue "honoring and supporting Native Americans and our Military". The review resulted in the decision to retire its name and logo, playing as the Washington Football Team pending adoption of a more permanent name.

Team president Jason Wright announced on July 12, 2021, that the new name would have no connection to Native Americans, research having shown that anything other than a clean break with the past is a slippery slope. While the team expected fans to continue to wear their jerseys with the former name and logo, Native American inspired headdresses or face paint would not be allowed in the stadium.

In January 2022, the team announced that it would choose between the names Armada, Presidents, Brigade, Red Hogs, Commanders, RedWolves, Defenders and the then-current "Football Team". The new name, the Washington Commanders, was announced on February 2, 2022. In its press release, the team emphasized the military symbolism of the graphic elements in the redesigned "W" primary logo that accompanied the name. The design of the new "crest" combines elements of the team's history and its connection to the city of Washington.

Activist Amanda Blackhorse responded that the name change was an empty gesture, the team's owner and management having made no substantial effort to acknowledge or repair the effects of decades of insults or advocate that other teams with offensive mascots also change.

In a 2024 poll, The Washington Post found that most local fans dislike the name Commanders but do not favor a return to the old name. In August 2024, Commanders owner Josh Harris reiterated that the team would not return to its old name for "obvious reasons".

== History ==
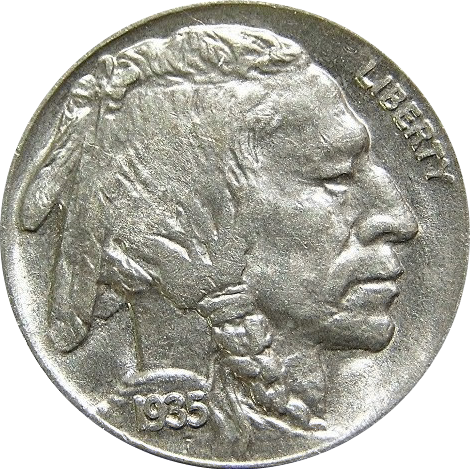
The obverse side of a Buffalo nickel, featuring the head of a Native American, was used as a model for the Redskins logo.

In 1933, the football team that shared both the name and playing field with the Boston Braves baseball team moved to Fenway Park, already home to the Boston Red Sox. Co-owner George Preston Marshall changed the name to the Redskins, more likely to avoid confusion while retaining the Native American imagery of the team than to honor coach William Henry "Lone Star" Dietz, whose identity as a Native American was debated. The logo for the NFL Braves was similar to the Redskins logo, a Native American head in profile with braids and trailing feathers. A redesigned logo introduced in 1972 was proposed by Walter Wetzel, a former Blackfoot tribal chairman and past president of the National Congress of American Indians, and was modeled after the likeness on the Buffalo nickel. Members of the Blackfoot tribe express a range of opinions, from support to indifference to strong opposition to the Redskins name based upon their personal experiences. In 2024, Republican Senator Steve Daines has stated his intention to block a bill to renovate RFK Stadium unless the Commanders honor the old logo and the Wetzel family. However, some members of the Blackfeet Nation council wonder why little of the money generated by the team while using the logo has been shared with the tribe.

Advocates of changing the team's name said that stereotypes of Native Americans had to be understood in the context of a history that includes conquest, forced relocation, and organized efforts by federal and state governments to eradicate native cultures, such as the boarding schools of the late 19th and early 20th centuries. "Since the first Europeans made landfall in North America, native peoples have suffered under a weltering array of stereotypes, misconceptions and caricatures. Whether portrayed as noble savages, ignoble savages, teary-eyed environmentalists or, most recently, simply as casino-rich, native peoples find their efforts to be treated with a measure of respect and integrity undermined by images that flatten complex tribal, historical and personal experience into one-dimensional representations that tells us more about the depicters than about the depicted."

=== Origin and meaning of redskin ===
Redskins logo and wordmark (1972–2019)

The historical context for the emergence in the Americas of racial identities based upon skin color was the establishment of colonies which developed a plantation economy dependent upon slave labor. Prior to the colonial era, many Europeans identified themselves as Christians rather than white. "At the start of the eighteenth century, Indians and Europeans rarely mentioned the color of each other's skins. By midcentury, remarks about skin color and the categorization of peoples by simple color-coded labels (red, white, black) had become commonplace."

Documents from the colonial period indicate that the use of "red" as an identifier by Native Americans for themselves emerged in the context of Indian-European diplomacy in the southeastern region of North America, before later being adopted by Europeans and becoming a generic label for all Native Americans. Linguistic evidence indicates that, while some tribes may have used red to refer to themselves during the Pre-Columbian era based upon their origin stories, the general use of the term was in response to meeting people who called themselves "white" and their slaves "black". The choice of red rather than other colors may have been due to cultural associations, rather than skin color.

In the debate over the meaning of the word "redskin", team supporters frequently cite a paper by Ives Goddard, a Smithsonian Institution senior linguist and curator emeritus, who asserts that the term was a direct translation of words used by Native Americans to refer to themselves and was benign in its original meaning. In an interview Goddard admits that it is impossible to verify if the native words were accurately translated. Darren R. Reid, a history lecturer at Coventry University, contends that Native American usage was generally attributed to them by European writers. Reid states that the team logo works together with the name to reinforce an unrealistic stereotype: "It is not up to non-Indians to define an idealized image of what it is to a Native American." The "positive" stereotypes allow fans and supporters to honestly state that they are honoring Native Americans, but this is "forcing your idea of what it is to honour those people onto them and that, fundamentally, is disrespectful". Sociologist James V. Fenelon makes a more explicit statement that Goddard's article is poor scholarship, given that the conclusion of the origin and usage by Natives as "entirely benign" is divorced from the socio-historical realities of hostility and racism from which it emerged.

Advocates of changing the name emphasize current meanings in dictionaries of American English, which include "usually offensive", "disparaging", (Note: Originally a translation of 18th-century Mississippi Valley French Peau Rouge, Native American person (peau, skin + rouge, red), a translation of non-deprecatory Native American self-designations such as Fox meeshkwinameshkaata, literally, "one having red skin" : meshkw-, red + -i-nameshk-, skin + -aa-, to have + -ta, participle suffix (used in opposition to designations of persons of European origin as waapeshkinameshkaata, "one having white skin" : waapeshk-, white + -i-nameshk-, skin + -aa-, to have + -ta, participle suffix).) "insulting", and "taboo". Such meanings are consistent with the usage found in books in the period between 1875 and 1930, which is after that studied by Goddard. John McWhorter, an associate professor of linguistics at Columbia University, compares "redskin" becoming a slur to other racial terms, such as "Oriental", which acquired implied meanings associated with contempt.

A controversial etymological claim is that the term emerged from the practice of paying a bounty for Indians, and that "redskin" refers to the bloody scalp of Native Americans. Although official documents do not use the word in this way, a historical association between the use of "redskin" and the paying of bounties can be made. In 1863, a Winona, Minnesota, newspaper, the Daily Republican, printed an announcement: "The state reward for dead Indians has been increased to $200 for every red-skin sent to Purgatory. This sum is more than the dead bodies of all the Indians east of the Red River are worth." A news story published by the Atchison Daily Champion in Atchison, Kansas, on October 9, 1885, tells of the settlers "hunt for redskins, with a view of obtaining their scalps" valued at $250. For sociologist C. Richard King the lack of direct evidence does not mean that contemporary Native people are wrong to draw an association between a term that emphasizes an identity based upon skin color and a history that commodified Native American body parts.

==== Trademark cases ====
The meaning of the term "redskin" was addressed in two cases challenging the trademark registrations held by Pro-Football, Inc., the team's corporate entity. The challenge was based upon a provision of Federal trademark law (the Lanham Act) which prohibited the registration of any mark that "may disparage persons, institutions, beliefs, or national symbols, or bring them into contempt, or disrepute". In both cases, the plaintiffs prevailed at trial, establishing that the name Redskin was disparaging to Native Americans. However, both decisions were overturned due to legal issues other than disparagement.

The first case, filed in 1992 by Suzan Shown Harjo and six other Native American leaders resulted in the cancellation of the federal registrations for the Redskins marks by the Trademark Trial and Appeal Board (TTAB) in 1999. However, in 2005 the United States District Court for the District of Columbia reversed the TTAB's decision on the grounds of insufficient evidence of disparagement. Subsequent appeals were also rejected on the basis of laches, that the Native American petitioners had pursued their rights in an untimely manner.

A second case was filed in 2013 by younger plaintiffs not affected by laches, led by Amanda Blackhorse. Once again, the TTAB found Redskins to be disparaging under the Lanham Act. In December 2015, the Federal Circuit Court of Appeals struck down the disparagement prohibition in the trademark law in a separate case (Matal v. Tam) involving a denial of trademark registration to the Asian-American band The Slants. On June 19, 2017, the Supreme Court unanimously ruled in favor of Tam, stating "The disparagement clause violates the First Amendment's Free Speech Clause. Contrary to the Government's contention, trademarks are private, not government speech." On June 29, 2017, both the Native American petitioners and the Justice Department withdrew from any further litigation now that the Supreme Court has rendered the legal issue moot. While team owner Daniel Snyder expresses the opinion that the court decision is a victory for the team, the executive director of the NCAI asserts that the name remains a slur, and the decision that grants it First Amendment protection does not alter any of the arguments against its continued use.

==== Use by Native Americans ====
Supporters of the Redskins name note that three predominantly Native American high schools use the name for their sports teams, suggesting that it can be acceptable. However, in 2013, the principal of one of these, Red Mesa High School in Teec Nos Pos, Arizona, said that use of the word outside American Indian communities should be avoided because it could perpetuate "the legacy of negativity that the term has created". Teec Nos Pos, on the Navajo Nation, is 96.5% Native American. Wellpinit, Washington, a town within a reservation of the Spokane people, is 79.3% Native American. In 2014, Wellpinit High School voted to keep the Redskins name. The third school, Kingston High School in Kingston, Oklahoma is 57.69% Native American.

Native American writer and attorney Gyasi Ross compares Native American use of variations of the word "redskin" with African-American use of variations of the word "nigger"; specifically Natives calling each other "skins" as analogous to "nigga". Ross argues that the use of terms by some members of minority communities does not mean that the same may be used by outsiders; this is generally recognized by white people with regard to black expressions, yet whites feel free to say how Natives should feel about "redskin". Ross also notes that there is no consensus among Natives regarding either opposition to the Washington team's use of the name, or the importance of the issue compared to more immediate concerns. However, in response to the argument that Native Americans ought to focus on social issues larger than a team name, Ross stated that "Native people shouldn't be forced to choose between living or racial discrimination. Those are false binaries."

== Controversy ==
In February 2013 a symposium on the topic was held at the Smithsonian's National Museum of the American Indian in Washington, D.C. Subsequently, the Oneida Indian Nation of New York sponsored a series of radio ads in each city to coincide with games of the 2013 season, each featuring a targeted message. A broader range of persons spoke in favor of change or open discussion, including local government leaders, members of Congress, and President Barack Obama. Statements in support of a name change by academic, civil rights and religious organizations were added to those that Native American groups have been making for decades.

In 2017, when professional sports dealt with a number of racial issues, from individual acts by players to widespread protests during the National Anthem, some commentators speculated why there had been no action to address the stereotyping of Native Americans, including the decision to have the Washington Redskins host a game on Thanksgiving.

=== Academic research ===
The issue is often discussed in the media in terms of offensiveness or political correctness, which reduces it to feelings and opinions, and prevents full understanding of the historical, psychological and sociological context provided by academic research on the negative effects of the use of Native American names and images by sports teams. The effect of stereotyping on high or low expectations, confidence, and academic performance has been well-established. This effect is enhanced due to the invisibility of Native Americans in mainstream society and media, leaving stereotypes as the primary basis for thinking about the abilities and traits associated with Natives, including the roles and opportunities Natives Americans envision for themselves. Furthermore, even when stereotypes are positive (e.g. "Native Americans are spiritual"), they may have a limiting, detrimental effect on individuals. Stereotyping may directly affect the academic performance and self-esteem of Native American youth, whose people face high rates of suicide, unemployment, and poverty. Euro-Americans exposed to mascots may be more likely to believe not only that such stereotypes are true, but that Native Americans have no identity beyond these stereotypes. Research indicates that exposure to any stereotypes increased the likelihood of stereotypical thinking with regard to other minority groups in addition to the target of the stereotype, a "spreading effect".

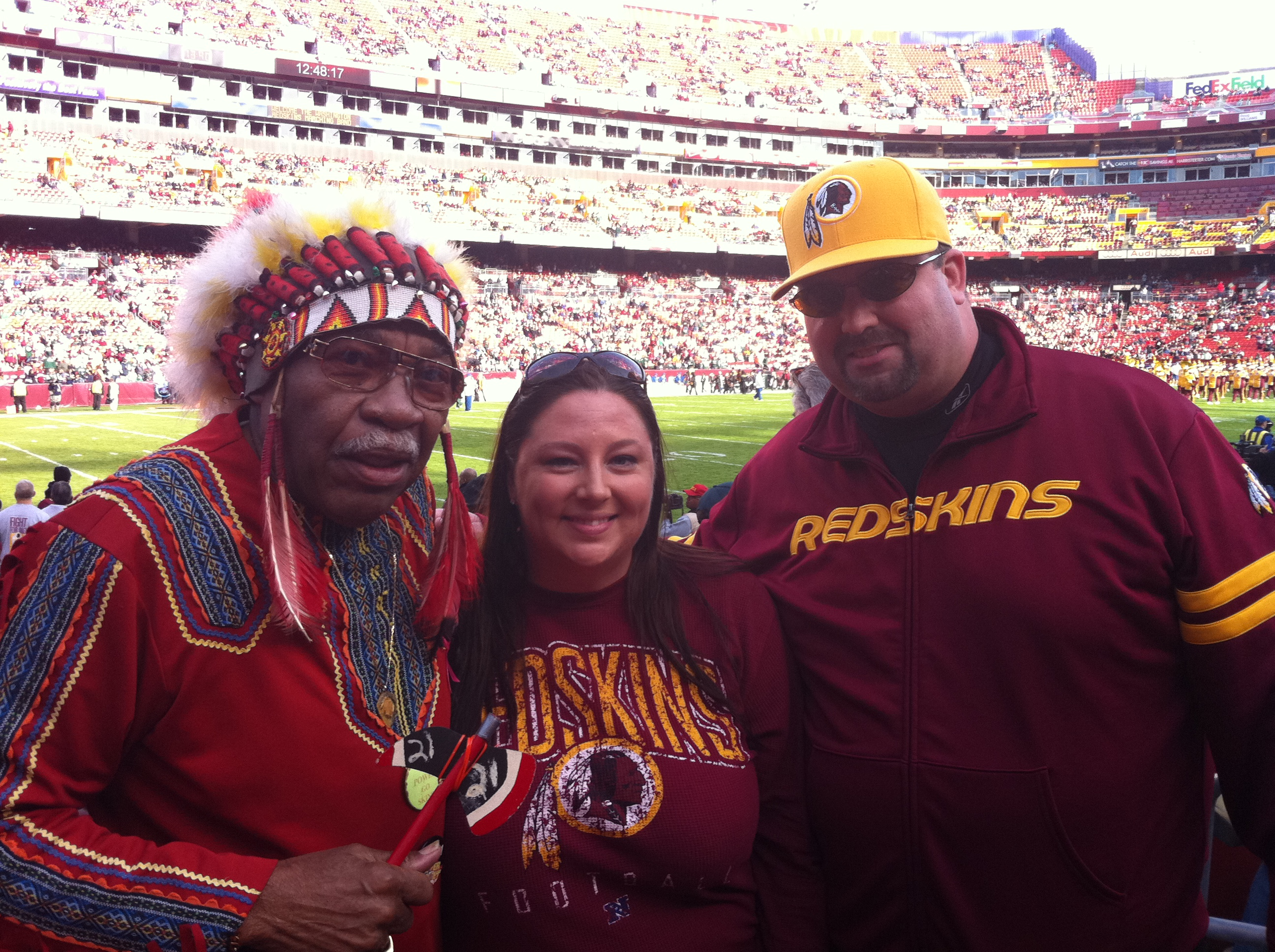
Chief Zee with other fans

Native Americans opposed to mascots point to the oversimplification of their culture by fans "playing Indian" with no understanding of the deeper meaning of feathers, face paint, chants, and dancing. Richard Lapchick, director emeritus of Northeastern University's Center for the Study of Sport in Society, wrote: "Could you imagine people mocking African Americans in black face at a game? Yet go to a game where there is a team with an Indian name and you will see fans with war paint on their faces. Is this not the equivalent to black face?" The unofficial mascot of the Redskins team was Zema Williams (aka Chief Zee), an African American man who attended games for 38 years beginning in 1978 dressed in a red faux "Indian" costume, complete with feathered war bonnet and rubber tomahawk. Other fans dressed in similar costumes for games.

In a report published by the Center for American Progress summarizing the research on "The Real Impact of Native Mascots and Team Names on American Indian and Alaska Native Youth", a case is made that the public debate misses the point, since individual opinions on either side do not matter given the measurable effects on the mental health of Native American young people exposed to such misrepresentations of their ethnic identity, and the often hostile or insulting behavior of non-natives that occur when teams with such names and mascots play. Clinical Psychologist Michael Friedman writes that the use of Native imagery, in particular the use of a dictionary defined slur, is a form of bullying, the negative impact of which is magnified by its being officially sanctioned.

The majority of scholars argue that the use of any stereotype, whether positive or negative, is a hindrance to the advancement of the targeted group. The national organizations representing several academic disciplines, after reviewing the research done on the issue, have passed resolutions calling for the end of all Native American mascots and images in sports. These include the Society of Indian Psychologists (1999), the American Counseling Association (2001), the American Psychological Association (2005), the American Sociological Association (2007). and the American Anthropological Association (2015). The executive board of the nation's leading organization of scholars of U.S. history approved a resolution in April 2015: "The Organization of American Historians hereby adds its voice to the growing demands by Native American organizations, our sister disciplines, and conscientious people of all ethnic backgrounds, to change the name and logo of the Washington 'Redskins'."

=== Native American advocates of change ===
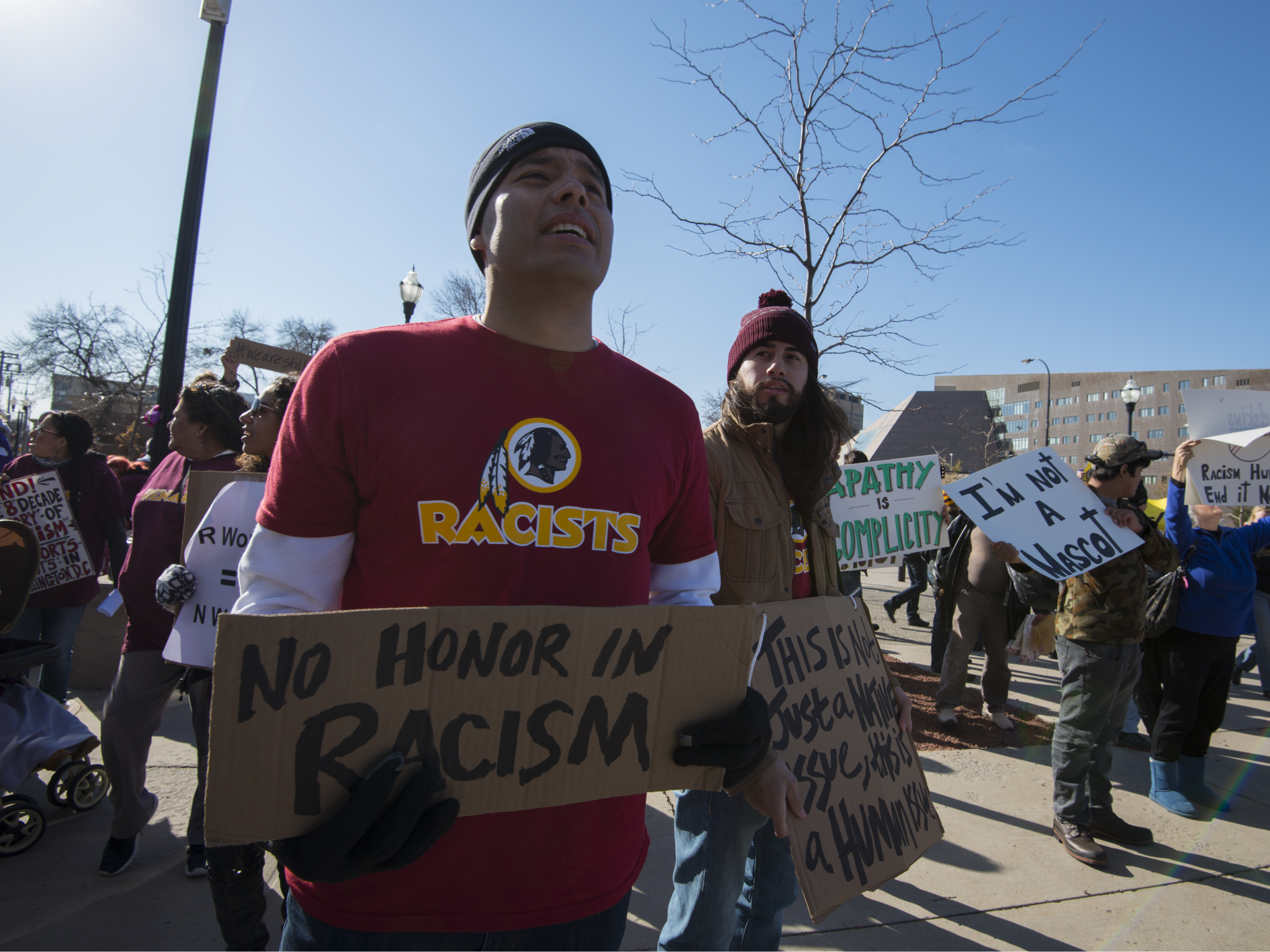
Protesters of the name, 2014

In the 1940s the National Congress of American Indians (NCAI) created a campaign to eliminate negative stereotyping of Native American people in the media. Over time, the campaign began to focus on Indian names and mascots in sports. The NCAI maintains that teams with mascots such as the Braves and the Redskins perpetuate negative stereotypes of Native American people, and demean their native traditions and rituals. The NCAI issued a new report in 2013 summarizing opposition to Indian mascots and team names generally, and the Washington Redskins in particular. In the trademark case, the TTAB placed significance on the NCAI opposition, estimating that the organization represented about 30% of the Native American population at the time the trademarks were granted, which met their criteria for a "substantial composite" of Native Americans finding the name disparaging. In its amicus brief filed in the case, the NCAI states that the combined enrollment of its member tribes in 2013 was 1.2 million individuals.

Many tribal councils have passed resolutions or issued statements regarding their opposition to the name of the Washington Redskins, including the Cherokee and Comanche Nations of Oklahoma, the Inter Tribal Council of Arizona, the Inter-Tribal Council of the Five Civilized Tribes, the Oneida Indian Nation (New York), the Standing Rock Sioux Tribe (North Dakota) and the United South and Eastern Tribes (USET). In April 2014, Navajo Nation Council voted in favor of a statement opposing the name of the Washington team, as well as other disparaging references to American Indians by other professional sports franchises. Other Native American groups advocating change include: the Native American Bar Association of DC, the National Caucus of Native American State Legislators, and the Society of American Indian Government Employees.

==== Redhawks culture jam ====
On December 13, 2017, a group of Native Americans — Rebecca Nagle (Cherokee Nation), Sebastian Medina-Tayac (Piscataway), Valarie Marie Proctor (Cedarville Band of Piscataway), Jair Carrasco, (Aymara), Lindsay Rodriguez (Cheyenne Arapaho), Jordan Marie Daniel (Kul Wicasa Oyate) and Nick Courtney (Makah) — created several authentic-appearing websites and a Twitter campaign that seemed to announce that the Washington Redskins had agreed to change its name to the "Washington Redhawks" for the 2018 season. At a news conference the following day the organizers stated that their effort was satire or parody, and were surprised that the Redskins issued a statement denying any plans to change, as if it were serious, or "fake news". The action was supported by some long-time activists on the issue including Suzan Shown Harjo and Jacqueline Keeler, who agreed that it served to stimulate new attention. In an interview, the organizers took exception to the framing of their action as a "hoax", which has negative connotations of intending to mislead, which this was not.

=== Civil rights and religious organizations ===
At its 2013 annual conference, the Leadership Conference on Civil and Human Rights (LCCHR), which includes the NAACP and the ACLU as members, passed a unanimous resolution of the 85 representatives present that, while recognizing that a business has the First Amendment right to use any name that it chooses, others need not be complicit in the use of a pejorative and insulting name; and calling upon all Federal, state and local government entities "to end any preferential tax, zoning, or policy treatment that could be viewed as supporting the franchise as long as it retains its current team name". The resolution also commended the "current and former government officials, media outlets, and other entities that have encouraged the Washington Redskins franchise to change its team name or that have refused to be complicit in promoting the current team name". In response, the team released a brief statement reiterating their previous position, and quoting two individuals as being both Native American and Redskins fans who do not want the name to change. The LCCHR also issued a press release in 2014 applauding the decision to cancel the trademark protection for the team's name. The NAACP issued their own press release supporting the TTAB decision stating "The NAACP has called specifically for this name change since 1992, and will continue to stand with the Native Indian community until the derogatory moniker has been changed."

The Fritz Pollard Alliance, a non-profit organization closely allied with the NFL on civil rights issues, announced its support of a name change in 2015 after repeated attempts to discuss the issue with the team owner and representatives. An attorney for the Alliance, N. Jeremi Duru, an American University law professor, made a study of the controversy in which he concluded that Native Americans are justified in finding the name offensive.

In 1992, the Central Conference of American Rabbis issued a resolution calling for the end of sports teams names that promote racism, in particular the Atlanta Braves and the Washington Redskins. The Anti-Defamation League was one of the organizations signing a letter to broadcasters urging them to avoid using the name. The Religious Action Center of Reform Judaism also advocated a name change.

In 2013 a group of 61 religious leaders in Washington, D.C., sent a letter to NFL Commissioner Roger Goodell and team owner Dan Snyder stating their moral obligation to join the Change the Mascot movement due to the offensive and inappropriate nature of the name which causes pain whether or not that is intended.

In June 2015, the United Church of Christ General Synod passed a resolution calling for a stop to using images or mascots that could be demeaning to the Native American community.

=== Protests ===
Although often assumed to be a debate of recent origins, local Washington, D.C. newspapers published news items on the controversy many times since at least 1971, all in response to Native American individuals or organizations asking for the name to be changed. National protests began in 1988, after the team's Super Bowl XXII victory, prompting numerous Native Americans to write letters to Redskins owner Jack Kent Cooke; others boycotted Redskins products and protested, but Cooke rejected the possibility of change. There was a protest of about 2,000 people at the 1992 Super Bowl between the Redskins and the Buffalo Bills; the American Indian Movement's (AIM) Vernon Bellecourt was one of the main organizers of the protest.

From 2013 to 2019, picketing at stadiums occurred occasionally when the Redskins played, particularly in cities with a significant population of Native Americans, such as Dallas, Denver and Minneapolis. The latter protest was supported by several Minnesota politicians and was documented by two films: Dodging Bullets—Stories from Survivors of Historical Trauma and More Than A Word. Picketing resumed for the 2014 season in Glendale, Arizona, when the team played the Arizona Cardinals, and again the largest rally was in Minneapolis, where estimates of the number of protestors was between 3,500 and 5,000. At a protest in Philadelphia in 2017, Native Americans pointed out the irony of NFL players making a statement opposing racial injustice by "taking a knee" for the National Anthem while one of the teams taking the field continues to use a racially offensive name and logo. Playing in Minnesota for the first time since 2014, hundreds of Native Americans protested against the team name outside of U.S. Bank Stadium during the game on October 24, 2019. On December 8, 2019, members of the Wisconsin Indian Education Association's Indian Mascot and Logo Task Force led a protest at Lambeau Field in Wisconsin. The Oneida Nation sponsored a video shown on the Jumbotron during the game expressing pride in being Native American as the antithesis of the message sent by the Redskins name and logo.

FedEx owned the naming rights to the team's stadium, FedExField until 2024, and had been the only corporate sponsor officially subject to boycotts by Native Americans: the Osage Nation, the Native American Rights Fund (NARF), and the Central Council of Tlingit and Haida Indian Tribes, the largest tribe of Native Alaskan peoples.

== Responses to the controversy ==
Following the February 2013 symposium "Racist Stereotypes and Cultural Appropriation in American Sports" at the Smithsonian National Museum of the American Indian, 10 members of Congress sent a letter to the Redskins' owner and the NFL Commissioner requesting that the name be changed since it is offensive to Native Americans. In response, Daniel Snyder told USA Today: "We'll never change the name. ... It's that simple. NEVER—you can use caps." Snyder addressed an open letter to fans that was published in The Washington Post on October 9, 2013, in which he stated that the most important meaning of the name is the association that fans have with memories of their personal history with the team. Snyder also states that the name was chosen in 1933 to honor Native Americans in general and the coach and four players at that time who were Native American; and that in 1971 coach George Allen consulted with the Red Cloud Indian Fund on the Pine Ridge Indian Reservation when designing the logo. In 2013, the Red Cloud Athletic Fund sent a letter to the Washington Post stating that "As an organization, Red Cloud Indian School has never—and will never—endorse the use of the name 'Redskins'. Like many Native American organizations across the country, members of our staff and extended community find the name offensive."

In June 2013, NFL commissioner Roger Goodell defended the name by citing its origins, traditions and polls that support its popularity. In February 2018, following the announcement by MLB Commissioner Robert Manfred that the Cleveland Indians would remove their Chief Wahoo logo from the stadium and uniforms, Goodell stated that the Redskins name and logo would remain, primarily citing the 2016 Washington Post opinion poll.

On their website the team stated that a 2014 annual NFL poll showing 71 percent support for the name, "along with the poll taken among Native Americans by the Annenberg Institute, demonstrates continued, widespread and deep opposition to the Redskins changing our name... We respect the point of view of the small number of people who seek a name change, but it is important to recognize very few people agree with the case they are making."

Bruce Allen addressed a letter dated May 23, 2014, to then Senate majority leader Harry Reid repeating the position that the name was originated by Native Americans to refer to themselves, that the logo was also designed and approved by Native American leaders, and that the vast majority of both Native Americans and the public do not find the name offensive.

Conservative columnists George Will and Pat Buchanan stated that opponents of the team name are being oversensitive, although Charles Krauthammer drew a parallel between the evolution of "Negro" and "Redskin" from being in common use to being condescending and insulting. W. James Antle III, Rich Lowry, and Dennis Prager wrote that outrage over mascots is manufactured by white liberals, rather than being the authentic voice of Native Americans.

=== Public opinion ===
From 2013 to 2014, national opinion polls consistently indicated that some majority of the general public opposed changing the name of the team: 79 percent (April 2013), 60 percent (June 2014), and 71 percent (September 2014). The latter poll found that 68 percent of respondents thought the name was not disrespectful of Native Americans, 19 percent said it showed "some" disrespect, and 9 percent said it was "a lot" disrespectful. Three polls of adult residents of the Washington, D.C., metropolitan area found that most respondents supported the team name, but 59 percent, 56 percent, and 53 percent also said that the word "redskin" is offensive to Native Americans in at least some contexts.

Opinion polling was also part of the discussion about whether Native Americans found the term redskin insulting. Two national political polls, the first in 2004 by the National Annenberg Election Survey and another in 2016 by The Washington Post. were particularly influential. When a respondent identified themselves as Native American, both polls asked, "The professional football team in Washington calls itself the Washington Redskins. As a Native American, do you find that name offensive or doesn’t it bother you?". In both polls, 90% responded that they were not bothered, 9% that they were offended, and 1% gave no response. These polls were widely cited by teams, fans, and mainstream media as evidence that there was no need to change the name of the Washington football team.

In a commentary published soon after the 2004 poll, 15 Native American scholars collaborated on a critique that stated that there were so many flaws in the Annenberg study that rather than being a measure of Native American opinion, it was an expression of white privilege and colonialism. A 2019 poll by University of California, Berkeley surveyed 1,021 Native Americans, twice as many as in any previous polls. Aggregating the results for easier comparison to the Washington Post 2016 poll, 49% of self-identified Native Americans said the Washington Redskins name was offensive, 38% said not offensive and another 13% were indifferent. But it was thought offensive by 67% of respondents who were heavily engaged in their native or tribal cultures, 60% of young people, and 52% of those with tribal affiliations.

=== Native American opinion in support of Redskins name ===
Three Virginia Indian leaders said in 2013 that they are not offended by the name Redskins but are more concerned about other issues such as the lack of Federal recognition for any Virginia tribe. (Note: In 2016, Federal recognition was granted to the Pamunkey Tribe of Virginia.) Robert "Two Eagles" Green, retired chief of the Fredericksburg area Patawomeck Tribe, stated on a radio talk show he would be offended if the team changed its name. In an article in The American Spectator, the chief of the Patawomeck Tribe, John Lightner, said that while he was not offended by the current name, he would support changing the team to the Washington Potomacs.

On November 25, 2013, as part of the NFL's "Salute to Service" month and Native American Heritage month, the Washington Redskins recognized four members of the Navajo Code Talkers Association briefly during a commercial break. One of them, Roy Hawthorne, has stated, "My opinion is that's a name that not only the team should keep, but that's a name that's American." This action was criticized by Amanda Blackhorse, also Navajo, who described it as a publicity stunt. In April 2014, Navajo Nation Council voted in favor of a statement opposing the name of the Washington team, as well as other disparaging references to American Indians by other professional sports franchises. Later that year, members of the Navajo and Zuni Tribes and students from the Red Mesa Redskins High School attended a Redskins vs. Cardinals game as guests of the Washington team.

In 2014, the Redskins released a two-minute video on YouTube entitled "Redskins is a Powerful Name" in which several Native Americans express their support for the team. Of the fourteen individuals, five are members of the Chippewa Cree tribe on the Rocky Boy Indian Reservation in Montana and are associated with the Team Redskins Rodeo club. Two are Mike Wetzel and Don Wetzel Jr. (Blackfoot), descendants of the logo designer, and the six others are members of diverse tribes and state that they are fans of the team and find nothing wrong with the name, or think it is positive. One of the individuals in the video is Mark One Wolf, who was reported as being born Mark E. Yancey in Washington, D.C., of African-American and Japanese descent.

=== Political opinion ===
In July, 2020, the Board of Supervisors of Loudoun County, Virginia, which is the location of the corporate headquarters of the team, sent a letter to the owner urging a change.

In the mid-2010s, the majority of those advocating a name change were Democrats, though there was no indication that the issue is of any real significance in electoral decisions given that Native Americans are such a small percentage of the electorate and are not likely to influence the outcome of any election. There are only eight states where Natives make up greater than 2 percent of the population: Alaska, Arizona, Montana, New Mexico, North Dakota, Oklahoma, South Dakota and Wyoming. However, polls during that period showed a definite political difference in the opinion of the general public, with only 58% of Democrats opposing a name change versus 89% of Republicans. Statements by political figures have generally been expressions of personal opinion rather than recommendations for government action. There have also been non-binding resolutions advocating name change proposed in New Jersey and passed in Minneapolis, New York State and California.

In November 2015, President Barack Obama, speaking at the White House Tribal Nations Conference, stated "Names and mascots of sports teams like the Washington Redskins perpetuate negative stereotypes of Native Americans" and praised Adidas for a new initiative to help schools change names and mascots by designing new logos and paying for part of the cost of new uniforms. On May 22, 2014, fifty U.S. Senators, forty-eight Democrats and two Independents, sent a letter to NFL Commissioner Goodell asking the league, referencing the Donald Sterling case, to "send the same clear message as the NBA did: that racism and bigotry have no place in professional sports." Five Democratic Senators declined to sign the letter, and Republicans were not invited to do so. During his 2016 presidential campaign, Donald Trump defended the name. In 2025 as President, Trump threatened to block a new stadium in Washington unless the team reverted the name change.

==== DC Metro area jurisdictions ====
The team headquarters is in Ashburn, Virginia and its home stadium, FedExField, is in Landover, Maryland. Much of the local political discussion has been about the location of a stadium, beginning in the 1990s. The mayors of Washington asserted that a return to the District of Columbia was contingent upon a name change, a possibility the team had rejected. In 2018 the NAACP also opposed the return of the team to the District unless the name were changed.

For many years, beginning with the departure of the Baltimore Colts, the Redskins were the only NFL team in a large area from Maryland into the southern states. This is slowly changing as Maryland NFL fans move to the Baltimore Ravens. Virginia fans were the more numerous and dedicated supporters of the Redskins, and the state and local governments used economic incentives to encourage the team's relocation of its facilities there, and maintain that the name is entirely a business decision for the team to make. Several Maryland politicians stated that the name should change, but governor Larry Hogan at that time opposed any change, also citing the desire to keep the stadium in Maryland.

=== Other teams that use the name Redskins ===
The number of high schools using the Redskins name has been in steady decline, 40% having had local efforts to change the name. Between 1988 and April 2013, 28 high schools in 18 states had done so. By December 2017, the number of high school "Redskins" had continued to decline from 62 to 49, including four affected by a 2015 California law. Following the Washington NFL decision, changes by high schools have accelerated, with 36 remaining.

College teams that had been Redskins changed their names voluntarily decades ago, including: the University of Utah became the Utah Utes in 1972; Ohio's Miami University became the RedHawks in 1997; and the Southern Nazarene University became the Crimson Storm in 1998.

== See also ==
- Native American mascot controversy
  - Atlanta Braves tomahawk chop and name controversy
  - Chicago Blackhawks name and logo controversy
  - Chief Wahoo
  - Cleveland Indians name and logo controversy
  - Kansas City Chiefs name controversy
- List of sports team names and mascots derived from indigenous peoples
- National Football League controversies
- Redwashing § Indigenous redwashing
- Syracuse Orange § Mascot
