= Pro-Football, Inc. v. Harjo =

U.S. trademark law case

- Court: United States Court of Appeals for the District of Columbia Circuit
- Full case name: Pro-Football, Inc. v. Suzan Shown HARJO, et al.
- Argued: April 8, 2005
- Decided: July 15, 2005
- Citation: 415 F.3d 44

Court membership
- Judges sitting: Circuit Judges A. Raymond Randolph, David B. Sentelle, David S. Tatel

Case opinions
- Per curiam

Script logo used by the Redskins (1972–2020).

Pro-Football, Inc. v. Harjo, 415 F.3d 44 (D.C. Cir. 2005), is a case in which the U.S. Court of Appeals for the District of Columbia considered the decision of the United States Patent and Trademark Office's Trademark Trial and Appeal Board (TTAB) to cancel the registration of the Washington Redskins football team, based on the claim that the name was disparaging to Native Americans. The Court of Appeals did not actually reach the merits of the TTAB's decision; it sent the case back to the trial court for consideration of a procedural issue.

== Facts ==
In 1992, activist Suzan Harjo led seven Native Americans in petitioning the TTAB to cancel six trademark registrations owned by Pro-Football, Inc., the corporate entity that operates the franchise then known as the Washington Redskins. The TTAB granted the petition, and the owner appealed to the United States District Court for the District of Columbia, which overturned the cancellation on two grounds. The District Court found that the TTAB lacked substantial evidence to find disparagement, and since the Redskins had registered their marks as early as 1967, the petition was barred by laches — an equitable legal theory which prohibits a party from waiting so long to file a claim that it becomes unfair to the other party.

The complainants then appealed this decision to the Court of Appeals.

== Issue ==
The Court of Appeals was presented with several questions:

1. Whether the complainants had indeed presented "substantial evidence" to the TTAB
2. whether a laches defense should apply at all in a disparagement case; and
3. if such a defense should apply, whether it would bar these particular complainants.

== Opinion ==
The Native Americans claimed that laches should not apply to a disparagement claim at all, because the law specifies that such a claim can be brought "at any time". The Court rejected this, noting that other language in the same statute specifically permits equitable defenses, and laches is such a defense.

The Court then considered the applicability of laches to the case at hand. Because the defense depends on the laxity of the plaintiff in pursuing his rights - which can not effectively be pursued until the plaintiff has reached the age of majority - the Court found that the defense could not be applied against the youngest plaintiff, who was only one year old when the trademarks were first registered in 1967. It vacated the District Court's application of laches to that plaintiff, and remanded the case for further consideration on that issue only. It retained jurisdiction over the rest of the case (including the question of whether the TTAB's decision had been supported by substantial evidence), pending the District Court's resolution of the laches issue.

The Court acknowledged the assertion by the owner that this finding would leave trademarks disparaging a group with a constantly expanding population "perpetually at risk". The fact that Pro-Football may never have security in its trademark registrations stems from Congress's decision not to set a statute of limitations and instead to authorize petitions for cancellation based on disparagement "at any time".

== Later developments ==
The case was remanded to the United States District Court for the District of Columbia for further proceedings relating to the youngest plaintiff only. In July 2008, that court found that the doctrine of laches was still applicable to that plaintiff, since he had turned 18 eight years before the case was filed. On November 16, 2009, the U.S. Supreme Court declined certiorari and refused to hear the Native American group's appeal.

In 2012, another case was brought by Native Americans, Blackhorse v. Pro-Football, Inc. with younger plaintiffs whose standing was not hindered by laches. On June 17, 2014 the TTAB ruled to void the Washington Redskins trademark finding the name "disparaging of Native Americans". On July 8, 2015, Judge Gerald Lee of the Eastern District of Virginia upheld that ruling.

The Redskins nickname controversy ended shortly before the 2020 NFL season when, under pressure from team sponsors, owner Daniel Snyder dropped the "Redskins" nickname, with Washington Football Team used as a placeholder name until the new name of Washington Commanders was announced on February 2, 2022.

== See also ==
- Native American mascot controversy
- Washington Redskins name controversy
