= Gyasi Ross =

American rapper

- Born: United States
- Education: Columbia Law School
- Occupations: Speaker, storyteller, author, commentator, attorney, rapper

External videos
- "Stop Making Native People “Political Fodder”" on DemocracyNow!, October 18, 2018

Gyasi Ross is a Blackfeet author, attorney, rapper, speaker and storyteller. He is the author of two books Don't Know Much About Indians (but I wrote a book about us anyways) (2011) and How to Say I Love You in Indian (2014) and he is a regular writer for The Huffington Post, Gawker and Indian Country Today.

== Life ==
Ross' family is Blackfeet and Suquamish. He attended six institutions of higher education (two universities, two community colleges, and two tribal colleges) before receiving his undergraduate degree. Ross then graduated from Columbia Law School.

He lives on the Port Madison Indian Reservation near Seattle. He is married to Miranda Belarde-Lewis, a professor at the University of Washington, and has three children.

== Issues ==
He has spoken out on Native American issues such as the Washington Redskins name controversy. In answer to the argument that Native Americans ought to focus on social issues larger than a team name, Ross stated that "Native people shouldn't be forced to choose between living or racial discrimination. Those are false binaries."

In 2015, Ross released his first spoken word album titled Isskootsik, or Before Here Was Here, on iTunes. Ross has prominently criticized another Seattle singer, Macklemore for his song "White Privilege II", which he considers itself to be an example of White privilege, as Macklemore a White singer takes the stage to speak on behalf of minorities, instead of giving them a chance to voice their own concerns. In response Ross published a song titled "White Privilege 3". He declared his support for Bernie Sanders in the 2016 Democratic presidential primary elections.

== Works ==
- Don't Know Much About Indians (but I wrote a book about us anyways), DKMAI, 2011, ISBN 9780983811800
- How to Say I Love You in Indian, Cut Bank Creek Press, 2013, ISBN 9780983811817
