= Amanda Blackhorse =

Native American social worker from Arizona

- Born: Amanda Leeh Blackhorse; February 1, 1982 (age 44); Kayenta, Arizona, U.S.
- Citizenship: Navajo Nation and U.S.
- Education: Haskell Indian Nations University (A.A.); University of Kansas (B.S.W.); Washington University in St. Louis (M.S.W.)
- Occupations: Social Worker; Journalist; Activist
- Years active: 2010–present
- Organization: Arizona to Rally Against Native American Mascots
- Known for: Opposing the name of the Washington Redskins football team

Amanda Blackhorse is a social worker and member of the Navajo people who is known for her work as an activist on the Washington Redskins name controversy. She is the lead plaintiff in Blackhorse v. Pro-Football, Inc.

== Biography ==
As of 2014, Blackhorse is a psychiatric social worker in Phoenix, Arizona. She has also worked at Arizona State Hospital.

While a student at the University of Kansas, she attended a game between the Washington Redskins and the Kansas City Chiefs at Arrowhead Stadium and reported:

At an NFL game in Kansas City, "people yelled, 'Go back to your reservation!' 'We won, you lost, get over it!' 'Go get drunk!' And so many different slurs … I've experienced racism in my lifetime, but to see it outwardly, and nobody did anything?"

== Blackhorse v. Pro-Football, Inc. ==
Blackhorse is the lead plaintiff in Blackhorse v. Pro-Football, Inc., which seeks to revoke trademark protection of the term "Washington Redskins". The case was actually begun by Susan Harjo, but Blackhorse is known by its rekindled efforts because her name is alphabetically first out of the new plaintiffs. The United States Patent and Trademark Office (USPTO) rejected an application to register "Redskins Hog Rinds" because it "consists of or includes matter which may disparage or bring into contempt or disrepute persons, institutions, beliefs, or national symbols". Since 1992, the USPTO has rejected eleven applications for other trademarks that included the word Redskins, based on the same reasons. Some of the applications were made by Pro-Football, Inc., including "Washington Redskins Cheerleaders".

On June 18, 2014, the Trademark Trial and Appeal Board (TTAB) of the USPTO voted to cancel the six trademarks held by the team in a two to one decision that held that the term "redskins" is disparaging to a "substantial composite of Native Americans", and this is demonstrated "by the near complete drop-off in usage of 'redskins' as a reference to Native Americans beginning in the 1960s." In a press release the trademark attorney for the team stated that they were confident that they would once again prevail on appeal, and that today's decision will make no difference in the continued use of the Redskins name.

Plaintiff Amanda Blackhorse said in an interview, "We’ve been through this process for eight years now. We will continue to fight. And, you know, this is not the end for us."

In June 2017 the Supreme Court ruled that the provision of the trademark law barring disparaging names was an unconstitutional infringement on freedom of speech. That case (Matal v. Tam) involved the denial of a trademark for an Asian-American rock band, "The Slants". Both the Native American petitioners and the Justice Department have withdrawn from any further litigation now that the Supreme Court has rendered the legal issue moot. Blackhorse called the decision disheartening after 11 years of litigation. While it may be legal for the team to use the name, she said, that doesn't make it right. The Washington Redskins would later drop their name in 2020, briefly becoming known as the Washington Football Team before adopting the name Washington Commanders in 2022, thus ending the debate.
