= National Annenberg Election Survey =

Agency overview
- Formed: 2000
- Jurisdiction: United States
- Headquarters: University of Pennsylvania, Philadelphia, PA
- Employees: Over 100,000 interviews per election cycle
- Parent agency: Annenberg Public Policy Center
- Website: annenbergpublicpolicycenter.org/naes

National Annenberg Election Survey (NAES) is the largest academic public opinion survey conducted during the American presidential elections. It is conducted by the Annenberg Public Policy Center at the University of Pennsylvania under the direction of Kathleen Hall Jamieson. The NAES is predicated on the assumption that campaign dynamics matter.

The NAES was first conducted during the 2000 election. Between November 1999 and January 2001, over 100,000 interviews were conducted with adults in the United States. During the 2004 election (between October 2003 and November 2004), another 100,000 interviews were conducted.

In addition to its largest sample size, the NAES is uniquely suited for the study presidential campaign dynamics because it employs a design called the rolling cross-section (RCS). The survey design protocols for the NAES were written by Canadian political scientist Richard Johnston.

The data from these studies are available on a CD included in the book Capturing Campaign Dynamics 2000 & 2004: The National Annenberg Election Survey (University of Pennsylvania Press, 2006).

== Books ==
- Daniel Romer, Kate Kenski, Kenneth Winneg, Christopher Adasiewicz, and Kathleen Hall Jamieson. (2006). Capturing Campaign Dynamics 2000 & 2004: The National Annenberg Election Survey. Philadelphia: University of Pennsylvania Press.
- Daniel Romer, Kate Kenski, Paul Waldman, Christopher Adasiewicz, and Kathleen Hall Jamieson. (2004). Capturing Campaign Dynamics: The National Annenberg Election Survey: Design, Method, and Data. New York: Oxford University Press.
