= Disparagement =

Trademark

Disparagement, in United States trademark law, was a statutory cause of action which permitted a party to petition the Trademark Trial and Appeal Board (TTAB) of the Patent and Trademark Office (PTO) to cancel a trademark registration that "may disparage or falsely suggest a connection with persons, living or dead, institutions, beliefs, or national symbols, or bring them into contempt or disrepute". In 2017, the Supreme Court struck down the disparagement provision as unconstitutional in Matal v. Tam.

== Determination ==
The PTO used a two-step test to determine whether the likely meaning of a mark used in connection with goods and services is disparaging to a group of people:

1. Would the mark be understood, in its context, as referring to an identifiable group of people?
2. May that reference be perceived as disparaging to a substantial composite of that group?

https://en.wikipedia.org/w/index.php?title=Disparagement&action=info According to Trademark Manual of Examining Procedure §1203.03(b)(i), “If that meaning is found to refer to identifiable persons, institutions, beliefs or national symbols,” the examiner moves to the second step, asking “whether that meaning may be disparaging to a substantial composite of the referenced group.”

Whether a mark involves an identifiable group involves consideration of:

1. The dictionary definition of the term;
2. The relationship of the term and other elements of the mark;
3. The type of product upon which the mark appears; and
4. How the mark will appear in the marketplace.

As noted below, this process was highly subjective and inconsistent. Rather than using standard dictionaries, the Trademark Office often relied upon questionable sources such as Urban Dictionary, a wiki-joke website.

Registration of terms that are historically considered disparaging has been allowed in some circumstances. Self-disparaging trademarks have been allowed where the applicant has shown that the mark as-used is not considered by the relevant group to be disparaging. One example of a registered mark with a self-disparaging term is Dykes on Bikes, a name for a lesbian motorcycle club, that was registered after a protracted legal battle. However, when the same organization applied for a trademark registration on their logo, it was once again rejected under the disparagement provision. Their second application was only granted after Matal v. Tam. Several analyses of the disparagement provision found that many applicants who were using a reappropriated and self-disparaging terms that could otherwise be neutral were rejected primarily because of the connection to the identity of the applicant. This was at issue in Tam, whose application for the term "slant" was denied precisely because he was a member of an all-Asian American band. In other words, Tam's ethnic identity provided the "context" of the mark in how it would appear in the marketplace - and therefore, would be connected with Asian Americans.

== Criticism of the Disparagement Provision ==
The TTAB has interpreted the Lanham Act to give broad standing to parties who claim they may be injured by a mark. Examples of trademarks that were refused or cancelled for disparagement include a depiction of Buddha for beachwear, use of the name of a Muslim group that forbids smoking as a cigarette brand name, and an image consisting of a large "X" over the hammer and sickle national symbol of the Soviet Union.

However, because the Lanham Act did not define "disparage", decisions on what constituted as disparaging were often inconsistent. The TTAB itself called the guidelines "somewhat vague" and "highly subjective". Similarly, the Supreme Court stated that "If the federal registration of a trademark makes the mark government speech, the Federal Government is babbling prodigiously and incoherently...it is expressing contradictory views."

In addition, legal scholars have also pointed out that determinations under the disparagement provision were content based, highly subjective, and inconsistent and vary with time, context, and tribunal. Megan Carpenter and Kathryn Murphy wrote, "Whether a mark is considered "scandalous" or "disparaging" can often change drastically given the context of the mark." Numerous examples include registrations and rejections for identical terms such as dyke, twatty, and queer.

Some critics have also raised the issue of equity and accessibility. In his law review article, Simon Tam (litigant in Matal v. Tam), argued that the disparagement provision was primarily used against communities of color, women, and the LGBTQ, since those groups were more likely to be engaged in reappropriation and therefore targets under the law. He writes, "Asking already burdened and under-resourced communities to appeal using a long, expensive process that does not allow the complexities of identity politics to be navigated properly is regressive and inequitable in nature. When one considers the effect on the marginalized, this places an undue burden on the applicant by an effort, which has never produced a positive result at the TTAB level."

Others have argued that the disparagement provision was a form of restriction on freedom of speech. Ultimately, the disparagement provision was struck down on those very constitutional grounds.

== See also ==
- Reappropriation
- Term of disparagement
- Trademark dilution
- Matal v Tam
