= Suzan Shown Harjo =

Cheyenne/Holdulgee Muscogee activist from Washington, D.C. (born 1945)

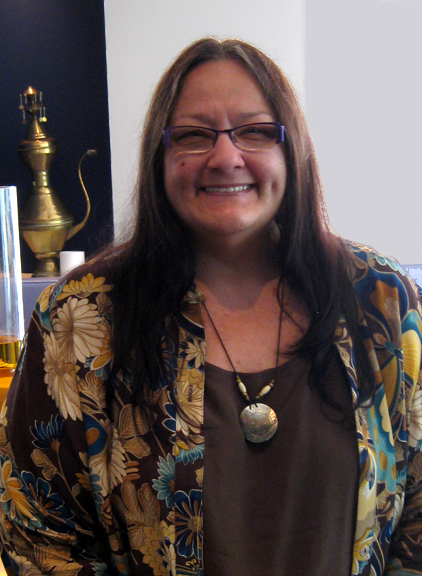
- Harjo in 2009
- Born: June 2, 1945 (age 81); El Reno, Oklahoma, U.S.
- Citizenship: Cheyenne and Arapaho Tribes, American
- Education: University of Arizona, School for Advanced Research
- Occupations: Advocate for American Indian rights, poet, writer, lecturer, curator
- Spouse(s): Frank Ray Harjo (deceased), John Alan Shown (deceased)
- Children: Duke Harjo, Adriane Shown Deveney
- Parent(s): Susie Rozetta Eades and Freeland Edward Douglas

Suzan Shown Harjo (born June 2, 1945) (Cheyenne and Hodulgee Muscogee) is an American advocate for Native American rights. She is a poet, writer, lecturer, curator, and policy advocate who has helped Native peoples recover more than one million acres (4,000 km²) of tribal lands. After co-producing the first American Indian news show in the nation for WBAI radio while living in New York City, and producing other shows and theater, in 1974 she moved to Washington, D.C., to work on national policy issues. She served as Congressional liaison for Indian affairs in the President Jimmy Carter administration and later as president of the National Council of American Indians.

Harjo is president of the Morning Star Institute, a national Native American rights organization. Since the 1960s, she has worked on getting sports teams to drop names that promote negative stereotypes of Native Americans. In June 2014, the Patent and Trademark Office revoked the Washington Redskins trademark; the owner said he would appeal. By 2013, two-thirds of teams with American Indian mascots had changed them due to these public campaigns.

On November 24, 2014, Harjo received the Presidential Medal of Freedom, the United States' highest civilian honor. Harjo was elected to the American Philosophical Society in 2022.

== Early years ==
Suzan Shown Harjo was born on June 2, 1945, in El Reno, Oklahoma, on the Cheyenne and Arapaho tribal jurisdictional area. Her mother was Cheyenne and her father Muscogee, and they lived on his allotment near Beggs. One of her maternal great-grandfathers was Chief Bull Bear (Cheyenne).

Between the ages of 12 and 16 she lived with her family in Naples, Italy, where her father was stationed while in the US Army. Upon her return to the States, she moved to New York City, where she worked in radio and the theater.

== Activism ==
The roots of Suzan Shown Harjo's activism date from the mid-1960s, when she co-produced Seeing Red, a bi-weekly radio program on New York's WBAI FM station; it was the first Indigenous news show in the United States. Some of her pioneering radio work is preserved at the Pacifica Radio Archives in Los Angeles. She worked on it with her husband, Frank Harjo, whom she met and married in New York. They also worked on issues of protecting religious freedom for American Indians. In New York she worked in independent theatre and radio, producing and performing in numerous plays. After seeing sacred garments in the Museum of the American Indian in New York in 1967, she worked for repatriation to tribes of such items and for changes in museum policies.

They moved to Washington D.C. in 1974, when Suzan Harjo started working as a legislative liaison for two law firms representing Indian rights. For a time she was also news director for the American Indian Press Association.

Harjo was elected to the Common Cause National Governing Board in 1982.

In 1978 President Jimmy Carter appointed Harjo as a Congressional liaison for Indian affairs. Harjo worked with multiple subcommittees within Congress to advocate Native American positions in the formation of federal policy. Harjo supported such issues as hunting and fishing rights on traditional lands, voting, and land contracts rights. Indian activists were filing longstanding claims for historic insufficient payment by the federal government for Indian lands under numerous treaties, and government representatives suggested there should be a statute of limitations for such claims. Her continued lobbying related to religious freedom helped lead to passage of the American Indian Religious Freedom Act (AIRFA) in 1978, which Carter supported.

In a Statute of Limitations for Indian Claims hearing on February 17, 1982, Harjo noted that the federal government had failed to comply with laws already in place to pay tribal nations settled claims since 1966. Harjo also fought for land rights. Congressional delays added to the time to settle such cases. As a Washington Post article reported on this issue, Harjo said, "They're adding 10 to 15 yrs. to a litigation process that is now going on... What I'm fearful is that tribes that are now negotiating in good faith... will back off and refuse to compromise."

== National Congress of American Indians ==
Suzan Shown Harjo served as the Executive Director of the National Congress of American Indians (NCAI) from 1984 to 1989. The NCAI, a non-profit organization to represent all Native American Indians as well as Alaska Natives, was founded in 1944.

Harjo persisted in working with Congress to support Native American rights to traditional hunting and fishing. She supported gaining more funds for Native American education. The NCAI goal was to ensure Native American children were educated, and with her leadership they gained increased appropriations for that purpose in 1984, 1986, and 1988. Harjo pressed the Congressional committee to gain access to government documents related to programs for Native Americans, and asked for continued support of Native American attempts at economic development. In the 1980s, she was concerned about declining federal support for health clinics on reservations and the adverse result of subsequent higher mortality rates among Native Americans.

During this period, Harjo continued to work on issues of repatriation of sacred items from museums to tribes, and changes in the ways researchers dealt with American Indian human remains and artifacts. Her work, together with hundreds of others, resulted in additional reforms and national legislation in 1989 and 1990.

She has spoken out against the negative portrayals of Native Americans in stereotypes featured in movies and television. Harjo has criticized author Ward Churchill's controversial claim of Native American ancestry, which is unsupported by documentation. She has publicly denounced his claims.

Harjo has appeared as a spokesman for Native American issues on many television programs, including Oprah!, C-SPAN, and Larry King Live.

Harjo is a long-time columnist for the online newspaper Indian Country Today.

== Federal laws ==
Harjo contributed to development and passage of federal legislation protecting Native sovereignty, arts and cultures, language, and human rights. These include the 1978 American Indian Religious Freedom Act (AIRFA); which allowed the protection of Native Americans for practice of traditional religion and rituals. In the first year of its enactment, it enabled the first repatriation of sacred items to American Indian tribes. In 2004, she published a keynote lecture as an article in the academic journal Wíčazo Ša Review: this article offers a twenty-five-year retrospective on the passage of AIRFA, discussing its genesis, impact, and legacies. Harjo considers in this article the American Indian Religious Freedom Act in light of the U.S. Supreme Court decision, Lyng v. Northwest Indian Cemetery Protective Association (1988), while describing what activists did to advance legislation in response to it.

She also was involved in working for the 1989 National Museum of the American Indian Act, which authorized establishment of the museum at two sites, at the former Customs Building in New York City, and construction of a new building on the Mall; the 1990 Native American Graves Protection and Repatriation Act (NAGPRA), which allows tribes to reclaim their human remains and ceremonial items from publicly funded institutions; and the 1996 Executive Order on Indian Sacred Sites.

== Morning Star Institute ==
As president of the Morning Star Institute, which she founded in 1984 in memory of her late husband, Frank Harjo, Suzan Harjo promotes sacred land claims and protection for traditional cultural rights, artistic expression, and research. In this and other positions, she has lobbied and helped secure the return of one million acres, including holy lands, to the Cheyenne, Arapaho, Lakota, Zuni, Taos, Mashantucket, and other Indian nations. She has gained passage of laws to extend the amount of time a Native American can sue for damages against third parties, create protections for Native American children, and institute protective measures for Indian lands and tribal governmental tax status.

The MSI sponsors Just Good Sports, devoted to ending use of American Indian mascots and stereotypes by sports teams, a cause of Harjo's since the 1960s. Along with seven Native plaintiffs, including Vine Deloria, Jr. and Mateo Romero, Harjo was a party in Harjo et al v. Pro Football, Inc., filed on September 12, 1992 with the US Patent and Trademark Office (PTO) Trademark Trial and Appeal Board (TTAB) to cancel the registration of the Washington Redskins football team, as they said the name was disparaging to Native Americans. The three PTO judges unanimously ruled in favor of the Native Americans plaintiffs.

But, Pro Football appealed to the United States District Court, which ruled against the plaintiffs on the question of laches. The U.S. Supreme Court declined the plaintiff's petition for judicial review and refused to hear the Native American group's appeal. This case was followed by Blackhorse et al. v. Pro Football , in which six young Native American plaintiffs challenged the federal trademark licenses of the Washington football team name.

Harjo has continued to speak publicly in favor of a change. On June 18, 2014, the US Patent and Trademark Office again revoked the registration for the Washington Redskins, saying the name was "disparaging." The team owner said he would appeal.

Activism by Harjo and others has resulted in dramatic changes in the sports world since the late 20th century: by 2013 two-thirds of teams with American Indian mascots had dropped them due to these public campaigns by Harjo and others. She also has worked with college and high school sport teams to eliminate names that reinforce negative stereotypes associated with Native Americans.

Harjo worked on the 1992 Alliance, formed to develop alternative ways to mark the Quincentennial of Columbus' arrival in the Americas, which Native Americans considered the beginning of terrible times for them. She ensured that tribes that have survived were celebrated, as well as mourning tribes that became extinct. Harjo has also written poems related to this history.

The Morning Star Institute has organized the National Prayer Day for Sacred Places, an annual event to highlight efforts to protect and preserve places sacred to Native Americans.

== Smithsonian's National Museum of the American Indian ==
Harjo was a trustee of the Museum of the American Indian and its corresponding collection 1980 to 1990. When, in 1990, the Museum of the American Indian became the National Museum of the American Indian, Harjo served as a founding trusting from 1990 to 1996. During this time, Harjo oversaw the creation of the museum's exhibition and repatriation policies.

From 2004 to 2005, Harjo was the director of the Native Languages Archives Repository Project, which established methods of linguistic preservation including information on safe storage of artifacts and a guide for identifying lost artifacts in other archives. As acting director, Harjo coauthored the section of the "ANA Native Language Preservation: A Reference Guide for Establishing Archives and Repositories" concerning what constitutes a language repository, how to construct the necessary foundations for a language repository, and how to find sources within the language repository.

In 2014, Harjo curated an exhibit entitled "Nation to Nation: Treaties Between the United States and American Indian Nations" at the Smithsonian's National Museum of the American Indian. Accompanying the exhibit, she edited a book, which serves as an encyclopedia of treaties between Native nations and the United States. Additionally, the book contains several chapters of Harjo's own analysis of U.S. policies and their direct impact on her family.

== Academic recognition ==
Harjo has been selected or invited for stays at universities to lead special classes in poetry and policy. In 1992 she was the first Native American woman to receive the Montgomery Fellowship at Dartmouth College, which was originally established to educate American Indians. In 1996 she was the first Native person to be selected as a Stanford University Visiting Mentor.

The School for Advanced Research (SAR) in Santa Fe, New Mexico awarded her two succeeding fellowships in 2004, the Dobkin Artist Fellowship for Poetry and the Summer Scholar Fellowship. At SAR, Harjo chaired two seminars, about Native Identity and Native Women's Cultural Matters. At the University of Pennsylvania Museum in 2006, she chaired a seminar on "US Civilization and Native Identity Policies." In 2008, Harjo was selected as the first Vine Deloria, Jr. Distinguished Indigenous Scholar at the University of Arizona.

== Writing ==
Harjo first published her poetry in an Italian magazine, when she was 12 years old. "I began writing poetry because of the poetics and density of Cheyenne and Muscogee oral history as related by my Cheyenne mother and her parents and my Muscogee father and his parents," says Harjo. For the first International Women's Day in the 1970s, Harjo wrote the poem "gathering rites" and read it at "Women/Voices at Town Hall" in New York City. She was one of 20 American women writers featured that day, who included Alice Walker and Nikki Giovanni. Harjo also has presented the poem on the West Steps of the US Capitol.

During her fellowships at the School for Advanced Research in 2004, Harjo wrote poetry inspired by oral history related to her time working for land claims, repatriation laws and policies. She also is a columnist for Indian Country Today Media Network and a contributing writer to First American Art Magazine.

== Personal life ==
In New York, she married Frank Ray Harjo (died 1984). He was an artist and they co-produced Seeing Red, a biweekly news program on WBAI radio. They had two children together.

== Works ==
=== Books ===
- Romero, Mateo. Painting the Underworld Sky: Cultural Expression and Subversion in Art. Santa Fe, NM: SAR Press, 2006. ISBN 978-1-930618-79-4. (Harjo wrote the foreword)
- Deloria Jr., Vine. We Talk, You Listen: New Tribes, New Turf. Lincoln: Bison Books, 2007. ISBN 0-8032-5985-9. (Harjo wrote the introduction)
- Suzan Shown Harjo, editor. Nation to Nation: Treaties Between the United States and American Indian Nations. Washington, D.C.: Smithsonian Books, 2014. ISBN 1-58834-478-9.
- Verzuh, Valerie K. Indian Country: The Art of David Bradley. Santa Fe: Museum of New Mexico Press, 2015. ISBN 0-89013-601-7. (Harjo wrote the foreword)

=== Exhibitions ===
- "Visions from Native American Indian Art," 1992, U.S. Senate Rotunda Building; Washington D.C.
- "American Icons Through Indigenous Eyes, 2007, District of Columbia Arts Center; Washington D.C.
- "Nation to Nation: Treaties Between the United States and American Indian Nations," 2014, National Museum of the American Indian; Washington D.C.

=== Film/Video ===
- Documentary, Sacred Earth: Makoce Wakan (1993), about the Native Americans' sacred lands and their need of protection.

=== Articles ===
- "Chief Offenders", Native Peoples Magazine, Summer 1999 (related to sports mascot issue).
- "American Indian Religious Freedom Act after Twenty-Five Years: An Introduction," Wíčazo Ša Review, Vol. 19, No. 2, Autumn 2004.
- "Carlisle Indian School's History Must Be Preserved So Those Who Suffered Aren't Forgotten." Indian Country Today Media Network, October 11, 2012.
- "Washington 'Redskins' is a racist name: US pro football must disavow it," The Guardian, January 17, 2013.
- "Cultural Heritage, Art, & Living Beings: Justice Lost in Translation," First American Art Magazine, No. 1, Fall 2013 (related to the Paris auction of Hopi Friends).
- "The R-Word Is Even Worse Than You Think," Politico, June 23, 2014.

=== Poetry ===
Harjo's poems have appeared in numerous journals including Antaeus, New York Quarterly, Nimrod, and the Potomac Review. They have been published in several anthologies, including Reinventing the Enemy's Language: Contemporary Native Women's Writings of North America, The Remembered Earth: An Anthology of Contemporary Native American Literature, and Third World Women.

- Repatriation Laws and Policies: An Oral History Poetry Collection (2004).
- Several of her poems were published in the Beltway Poetry Quarterly, Fall 2005.

=== Plays ===
- My Father's Bones, written in collaboration with Mary Kathryn Nagle, 2013.

== See also ==
- List of Native American politicians
- Native American women in politics
