= Matal v. Tam =

- Supreme Court of the United States

Argued January 18, 2017 Decided June 19, 2017
- Full case name: Joseph Matal, Interim Director, United States Patent and Trademark Office, Petitioner v. Simon Shiao Tam
- Docket no.: 15-1293
- Citations: 582 U.S. 218 (more) 137 S. Ct. 1744; 198 L. Ed. 2d 366; 122 U.S.P.Q.2d 1757
- Argument: Oral argument

Case history
- Prior: In re Tam, 808 F.3d 1321 (Fed. Cir. 2015); cert. granted, 137 S. Ct. 30 (2016).

Holding
- The Lanham Act's prohibition against registering disparaging trademarks with the United States Patent and Trademark Office violates the First Amendment to the United States Constitution.

Court membership
- Chief Justice John Roberts Associate Justices Anthony Kennedy · Clarence Thomas; Ruth Bader Ginsburg · Stephen Breyer; Samuel Alito · Sonia Sotomayor; Elena Kagan · Neil Gorsuch

Case opinions
- Majority: Alito (Parts I, II, and III–A), joined by Roberts, Kennedy, Ginsburg, Breyer, Sotomayor, Kagan; Thomas (except Part II)
- Plurality: Alito (Parts III–B, III–C, and IV), joined by Roberts, Thomas, Breyer
- Concurrence: Kennedy (in part and in judgment), joined by Ginsburg, Sotomayor, Kagan
- Concurrence: Thomas (in part and in judgment)
- Gorsuch took no part in the consideration or decision of the case.

Laws applied
- U.S. Const. amend. I; Lanham Act

Matal v. Tam, 582 U.S. 218 (2017) (previously known as Lee v. Tam) is a Supreme Court of the United States case that affirmed unanimously the judgment of the United States Court of Appeals for the Federal Circuit that the provisions of the Lanham Act prohibiting registration of trademarks that may "disparage" persons, institutions, beliefs, or national symbols with the United States Patent and Trademark Office violated the First Amendment.

== Background ==
Simon Tam is the founder and bassist for the Asian-American dance-rock band The Slants. Tam gave that name to his band to "reclaim" and to "take ownership" of Asian stereotypes. On March 5, 2010, Tam filed his first application to register THE SLANTS. After several appeals, the application was eventually abandoned. On November 14, 2011, Tam filed his second application (App. No. 85/472,044) seeking to register the mark THE SLANTS for "Entertainment in the nature of live performances by a musical band", based on his use of the mark since 2006. The examiner at the US Patent and Trademark Office (PTO) refused to register Tam's mark and found it likely disparaging to "persons of Asian descent" under § 2(a). The examiner found that the mark likely referred to people of Asian descent in a disparaging way and explained that the term "slants" had "a long history of being used to deride and mock a physical feature" of people of Asian descent. The examiner found that a substantial composite of persons of Asian descent might find the term offensive precisely because it was being used by an Asian American band: "Here, the evidence is uncontested that applicant is a founding member of a band that is self described as being composed of members of Asian descent. ... Thus, the association of the term SLANTS with those of Asian descent is evidenced by how the applicant uses the work - as the name of an all Asian-American band." That determination made Tam decide to appeal before the Federal Circuit.

Before the United States Court of Appeals for the Federal Circuit in Washington, DC, the case was titled In re Tam. The PTO interpreted the likely meaning of "The Slants" as a term to refer to people of Asian descent, despite claims from the band that the actual meaning referred to its perspective and that it was repurposing the term from an offensive slur. The PTO used anecdotal sources like Urban Dictionary to support its claims. Survey data, linguistics experts, and legal declarations from Asian American community leaders were not considered. The opinion was heard en banc by the Federal Circuit and the majority, which was written by Circuit Judge Moore. The court determined that the Disparaging Provision (15 U.S.C. § 1052(a)) of the Lanham Act is unconstitutional and found that Tam was entitled to trademark registration. Tam was represented by John C. Connell, Ron Coleman and Joel MacMull, then of Archer & Greiner.

The US government petitioned the US Supreme Court for a writ of certiorari, which was granted in September 2016. In addition to the case, there was another case before the Fourth Circuit, Pro-Football, Inc. v. Blackhorse, 112 F. Supp. 3d 439 (E.D. Va. 2015), to decide the same issue of whether or not the disparaging provision of the Lanham Act was unconstitutional. Despite an attempt by Pro Football to merge the two cases, the Supreme Court refused to grant the motion.

Section 2(a)'s ban on the federal registration of "immoral" or "scandalous" marks originated in the trademark legislation of the Lanham Act. A disparaging mark is a mark that "dishonors by comparison with what is inferior, slights, deprecates, degrades, or affects or injures by unjust comparison".

== Relevant areas of law ==
=== Lanham Act's disparaging provision ===
No trademark by which the goods of the applicant may be distinguished from the goods of others shall be refused registration on the principal register on account of its nature unless it—

(a) Consists of or comprises immoral, deceptive, or scandalous matter; or matter which may disparage or falsely suggest a connection with persons, living or dead, institutions, beliefs, or national symbols, or bring them into contempt, or disrepute; or a geographical indication which, when used on or in connection with wines or spirits, identifies a place other than the origin of the goods and is first used on or in connection with wines or spirits by the applicant on or after one year after the date on which the WTO Agreement (as defined in section 3501(9) of title 19) enters into force with respect to the United States.

=== Viewpoint discrimination ===
Viewpoint discrimination occurs when the government bans not only certain content or topics but also certain ideas. The test for viewpoint discrimination is "[o]ther things being equal, viewpoint discrimination occurs when government allows one message while prohibiting the messages of those who can reasonably be expected to respond." Additionally, viewpoint discrimination involves the intent to discourage one viewpoint and to advance another. The general concern is that the government tries to eradicate not only content from the marketplace but also certain viewpoints, whether positive or negative. Something that rises to the level of viewpoint-based discrimination is deemed to be unconstitutional.

=== Content discrimination ===
In Reed v. Town of Gilbert, the court stated, "Government regulation of speech is content based if a law applies to particular speech because of the topic discussed or the idea or message expressed." The Court further determined, "This commonsense meaning of the phrase 'content based' requires a court to consider whether a regulation of speech 'on its face" draws distinctions based on the message a speaker conveys." For that reason, content-based discrimination is presumptively invalid. If something is found to discriminate on the basis of content, it must survive strict scrutiny.

=== Strict scrutiny ===
According to Nat'l Assoc. of Mfrs. v. Taylor: "[t]o satisfy strict scrutiny, the government must establish three elements: (1) 'the interests the government proffers in support' of the statute must be properly characterized as 'compelling'; (2) the statute must 'effectively advance [] those interests'; and (3) the statute must be 'narrowly tailored to advance the compelling interests asserted.'

=== Central Hudson: intermediate scrutiny ===
For Central Hudson to apply, the court would have to determine that the statute at issue deals with commercial speech. From Central Hudson, the Supreme Court developed a four-part test to determine whether a statute passes muster: (1) Whether the expression is protected by the First Amendment—for it to fall here, it must concern lawful activity and not be misleading; (2) whether the asserted governmental interest is substantial; (3) whether the regulation directly advances the governmental interest asserted; and (4) whether the regulation is no more extensive than necessary to serve that interest—there must be a "reasonable fit" between the government's ends and the means of achieving those ends.

=== Government speech ===
For something to be classified as government speech, courts look at four factors: (1) the central purpose of the program in which the speech in question occurs; (2) the degree of editorial control exercised by the government or private entities over the content of the speech; (3) the identity of the literal speaker; and (4) whether the government or the private entity bears the ultimate responsibility for the content of the speech.

== Federal Circuit ==
Simon Tam v. United States Patent and Trademark Office
- Court: United States Court of Appeals for the Federal Circuit
- Full case name: In re Tam
- Argued: October 2, 2015
- Decided: December 22, 2015
- Citation: 808 F.3d 1321

Case history
- Prior history: 108 U.S.P.Q.2d 1305 (finding THE SLANTS trademark invalid as disparaging under § 2(a) of the Lanham Act)

Holding
- The disparaging provision of the Lanham Act is unconstitutional for violating citizen's First Amendment rights. Vacated and Remanded.

Court membership
- Judges sitting: Moore, Prost, Newman, O'Malley, Wallach, Taranto, Chen, Hughes, Stoll, Dyk, Lourie, Reyna

Case opinions
- Majority: Moore, joined by Prost, Newman, O'Malley, Wallach, Taranto, Chen, Hughes, Stoll
- Concurrence: O'Malley, joined by Wallach
- Concurrence: Dyk, joined by Lourie, Reyna
- Dissent: Lourie
- Dissent: Reyna

Laws applied
- First Amendment; Lanham Act, 15 U.S.C. § 1052

The central issue before the Federal Circuit was to determine whether the disparaging provision of the Lanham Act was unconstitutional and should therefore be voided. In the case In re Tam, 808 F.3d 1321 (Fed. Cir. 2015), Circuit Judge Moore decided that the disparaging provision of the Lanham Act was unconstitutional for various reasons and that Tam should be granted trademark protection on THE SLANTS.

=== Viewpoint-based and content-based discrimination ===
The court determined that the Lanham Act was viewpoint-based discriminatory because the government chooses to deny trademark protection to a mark always because of the message that the mark conveys. The government tried to defend their position before the Federal Circuit by saying that it should be able to deny protection to the most "vile" racial epithets and images, but the Federal Circuit stated, "When the government discriminates against speech because it disapproves of the message conveyed by the speech, it discriminates on the basis of viewpoint." The Federal Circuit bolstered its stance that it is viewpoint discriminatory because the PTO refused to register "The Slants", but registered marks such as "Celebrasians" and "Asian Efficiency".

The Federal Circuit found the only difference between marks such as "The Slants" and "Celebrasians" and "Asian Efficiency" is the messages conveyed. The Slants could be seen as being derogatory towards those of Asian descent and the others positive.

In the alternative, the Federal Circuit determined that the disparaging provision is content-based discriminatory, in addition to viewpoint-discriminatory. Additionally, the Federal Circuit came to the determination that even though trademarks inherently deal more with commercial speech that expressive speech, when the government cancels a mark under the disparaging provision, it affects more the expressive aspects of speech than its commerciality. Therefore, the Federal Circuit found that if the disparaging provision is not found to be viewpoint discriminatory in light of a higher court potentially overturning parts of the case, it must be content-based discriminatory and survive strict scrutiny unless an exception applied.

=== Strict scrutiny or intermediate scrutiny (Central Hudson) ===
The government raised the argument that the disparaging provision of the Lanham Act should be reviewed under intermediate scrutiny by way of the Central Hudson test because the inherent nature of trademarks was commercial. However, the Federal Circuit determined that when the PTO chooses to cancel trademarks under the disparaging provision of the Lanham Act, it is usually because of their expressive components, not their commercial components. The Federal Circuit went on to say that commercial speech mixed with expressive speech should be treated as expressive under deciding whether to apply strict or intermediate scrutiny. Therefore, the Federal Circuit decided that strict scrutiny should be applied.

==== Federal Circuit's analysis ====
In the Federal Circuit's effort to show the unconstitutionality of the disparaging provision of the Lanham Act, it chose to analyze the provision under the Central Hudson intermediate scrutiny. The part of the Central Hudson test that the Lanham Act failed was the "legitimate interest" element.

For that element, the government raised three arguments for having a legitimate interest:

1. The government argued that it had a legitimate interest to dissociate itself from speech it finds odious.
2. The government argued that it had a legitimate interest in "declining to expend its resources to facilitate the use of racial slurs as source identifiers in interstate commerce".
3. The government also argued that it has a legitimate interest in allowing states to make their own determinations about whether trademarks should be unenforceable on grounds of public policy.

The Federal Circuit determined that none of the arguments raised by the government created an interest legitimate enough to pass the Central Hudson test. Since it did not pass the Central Hudson test, the Federal Circuit determined that it would also not pass strict scrutiny, which sets a higher standard.

=== Government subsidy ===
The government raised the argument that the Lanham Act should be classified as a government subsidy and therefore exempt from the strict scrutiny requirement. The Federal Circuit ultimately determined that no taxpayer dollars are used in registering trademarks, and their operation is completely user-funded from application fees. The Federal Circuit determined that therefore the government subsidy exception to strict scrutiny did not apply.

=== Government speech ===
The government also raised the argument that the disparaging provision of the Lanham Act was government speech and so fell outside of the purview of the First Amendment. The government argued that because of the ability to place the "®" or "TM" on the registered mark.

The Federal Circuit found that argument to be without merit. The court said that the only message the government conveys when a mark is registered with the PTO is that "a mark is registered". The court cited many reasons for its determination, but the most prominent was a policy consideration. The court was concerned that if they allowed that argument to win the day, it would also affect other areas of law, such as copyright and patent law. The general concern was that the government could then control what they would and would not grant protections to and would therefore affect the types of speech expressed. That would have the effect of abridging free speech, which violates the First Amendment.

=== Concurrence by Judge O'Malley ===
In addition to agreeing with Circuit Judge Moore's opinion, Judge O'Malley added that the disparaging provision of the Lanham Act was unconstitutional also by the vagueness doctrine.

=== Partial concurrence and partial dissent by Judge Dyk ===
Circuit Judge Dyk generally agreed with the majority opinion that the disparaging provision of the Lanham Act is unconstitutional, but the majority erred in going "beyond the facts of this case and holding the statute facially unconstitutional as applied to purely commercial speech". Judge Dyk also believed that many trademarks lack expressive characteristics that would merit First Amendment protection and so the analysis should be under the Central Hudson test, not strict scrutiny.

=== Dissent by Judge Lourie ===
Lourie disagreed with the majority in many ways:

- Lourie argued that the Lanham Act existed for 70 years, was continuously applied during that time, and was only then found to be unconstitutional, which seemed bizarre. Stare decisis was the first reason that the majority was making a mistake.
- Lourie also said that the denial of an applicant's trademark did not deny its right to speak freely. The mark holder may still generally use the mark as it wishes, and without federal registration, "it simply lacks access to certain federal statutory enforcement mechanisms for excluding others from confusingly similar uses of the mark."
- Lourie also said that there are other ways for the mark holder to have protections, including common law rights.
- Lourie finally determined that trademarks are exclusively commercial speech and so should not be analyzed under strict scrutiny.

=== Dissent by Judge Reyna ===
Reyna disagreed with the majority, feeling that trademarks are exclusively commercial speech and so should be analyzed under the Central Hudson test, meaning intermediate scrutiny. Reyna then determined he government has a legitimate interest in promoting the orderly flow of commerce and so the law should pass intermediate scrutiny. Reyna stated that when the legitimate interest of the disparaging provision is balanced on how narrowly tailored the statute is, it makes sense for the Lanham Act provision to survive scrutiny.

== Supreme Court ==
External audio
- Audio from Oyez (click "Oral Argument - January 18, 2017" at left)

The United States Patent and Trademark Office appealed the decision to the United States Supreme Court by presenting the following question in its petition for certiorari: "whether the disparagement provision in 15 U.S.C. 1052(a) is facially invalid under the Free Speech Clause of the First Amendment?" The Supreme Court agreed to grant certiorari in September 2016. Oral arguments were heard on January 18, 2017.

On June 19, 2017, the Supreme Court delivered judgment in favor of Tam by voting unanimously to affirm the lower court. The majority opinion stated, "The disparagement clause violates the First Amendment's Free Speech Clause. Contrary to the Government’s contention, trademarks are private, not government speech."

The Court ruled that the government cannot ban expression merely because it is offensive. In the majority opinion, Justice Alito wrote:

Speech that demeans on the basis of race, ethnicity, gender, religion, age, disability, or any other similar ground is hateful; but the proudest boast of our free speech jurisprudence is that we protect the freedom to express "the thought that we hate." United States v. Schwimmer, 279 U. S. 644, 655 (1929) (Holmes, J., dissenting).

The Court also ruled that the law was viewpoint discriminatory. Alito reasoned that the Court need not resolve whether the speech involved only commercial speech or also political speech because the federal law at issue could not pass even the Central Hudson test. Justice Kennedy wrote a concurring opinion that stated "by mandating positivity, the law here might silence dissent and distort the marketplace of ideas."

Justice Neil Gorsuch had not yet been a member of the court during the oral argument and so he did not participate in the decision.

== Impact on racial reclamation practices ==
Matal v. Tam has become linked with the Pro-Football, Inc. v. Blackhorse, which was vacated after Tam. Pro-Football had ruled in favor of Blackhorse's claim that the "Redskins" trademark "may disparage" Native Americans. Tam limited the option for Blackhorse to use Section 2(a) to challenge the disparaging Redskins mark. Simon Tam stated in a New York Times Article that Matal v. Tam was "a win for all marginalized groups" while recognizing that "[n]o one builds better communities by shutting people out."

== See also ==
- Iancu v. Brunetti, a similar 2019 Supreme Court case that determined the Lanham Act restriction in "immoral" or "scandalous" trademarks was unconstitutional for reasons similar to Matal
- List of United States Supreme Court cases, volume 582
