= Marching Chiefs =

Marching band of Florida State University

The Florida State University Marching Chiefs
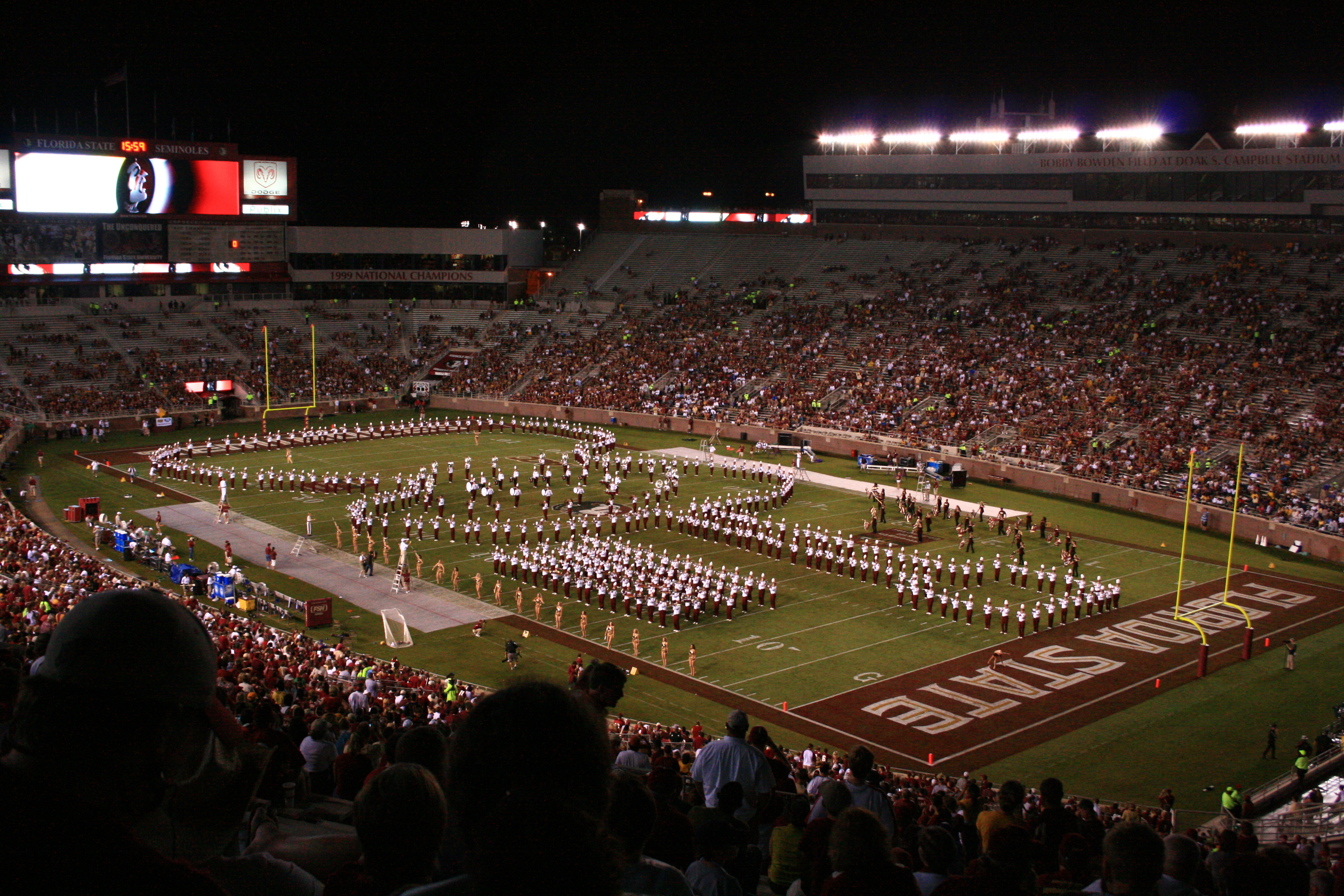
- School: Florida State University
- Location: Tallahassee, FL
- Conference: ACC
- Founded: 1939
- Director: Dr. Patrick Dunnigan (wind); Dr. David Plack (athletic); Dr. Devan Moore (assistant athletic)
- Members: 423
- Website: fsuchiefs.com

The Florida State University Marching Chiefs is the official marching band of Florida State University. The band has served in this capacity since the 1940s and continues to perform at all home football games as well as several away games each year; they have also performed at baseball and softball games. There are over 400 members, or Chiefs, as members are sometimes known, in the band who hail from almost every academic department within the university.

== History ==
The first appearance of a formal band was organized in the late 1930s by Charlotte Cooper, Jean Hitchcolk, Allice Ludlaw, and director Owen F. Sellars. The band, which consisted of less than twenty students, performed at the Odds and Evens intramural football game on Thanksgiving Day 1939 (Observed November 30). The following year the Florida Flambeau ran an announcement of try-outs for the now established band. In 1942 Sellars took military leave for World War II and Frank Sykora became the interim director. The same year uniforms were purchased and worn for the first time at the inauguration of Doak S. Campbell as the new college president. 1946 saw the first option for students to take marching band for credit.

In 1947 the Florida State College for Women officially became Florida State University and the university was changed to coeducational by an act of the Florida Legislature. With the change to a coed school came the introduction of a male football team which competed in a five-game season. The marching band performed at the games and practiced on Landis Green under Robert Smith.

1949 saw a new director for the band, Robert T. Braunagel, and the new, official name of "Marching Chiefs." The name was chosen by a newspaper survey sponsored by the Student Government Association. The first appearance of the newly christened Marching Chiefs was at Stetson University. Dr. Manley R Whitcomb became the new director of the Marching Chiefs in 1953 after transferring from Ohio State University and joining the FSU faculty. Dr. Whitcomb brought with him a talented young arranger by the name of Charles Carter who became the official arranger of the Marching Chiefs. Carter's arrangements gave the Marching Chiefs a distinctive style that survives to this day. Whitcomb also brought with him the traditional eight-to-five step, fast marching tempos, and the high step with arm swing now known as "Chief Step."

The 1949–50 football season saw the Seminoles' and the Marching Chief's first appearances in a postseason bowl game at the Cigar Bowl in Tampa, FL. 1954 marked the Seminoles next appearance in a bowl at the Sun Bowl in El Paso, Texas. The Miami Daily News proclaimed, "FSU's bid to Sun Bowl clinched by Marching Chiefs." In the spring of 1955 FSU received a charter of Kappa Kappa Psi honorary band fraternity and Tau Beta Sigma honorary band sorority. The brothers/sisters of KKPsi and TBS, as the organizations are commonly known, produced a newsletter named The Chieftain which aimed to keep band members informed of upcoming events and activities. In 1956 Charlie Carter arranged J. Dayton Smith's The Hymn to the Garnet and the Gold for band. The Charlie Carter arrangement had its premier performance at the 1958 homecoming game.

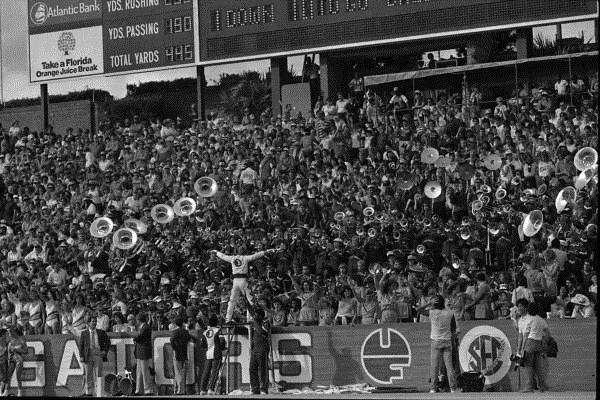
Marching Chiefs performing at the UF game in 1981

The in-state American football rivalry between Florida State and UF began with their first meeting in 1958 but it was not until 1964 that a standing home-and-away series was launched.

1969 saw the beginning of a new tradition for the Marching Chiefs with the newly created Band Alumni Association (Now FSU Marching Chiefs Alumni) putting graduates of the Marching Chiefs onto the field for halftime.

In 1971 Richard Mayo, an FSU alumnus and former drum major, take over direction of the Chiefs in a year in which membership grew to over 200 students. The Marching Chiefs were also finalists in the Best College Marching Band contest on ABC-TV which established their reputation as one of the nation's finest marching bands. In 1974 the Marching Chiefs gained the title of "world-renowned" as a result of an international performance at the International Trade Fair in Damascus, Syria as a guest of State Department. While in the Middle East, Chiefs performed in Amman, Jordan as a command performance for King Hussein.

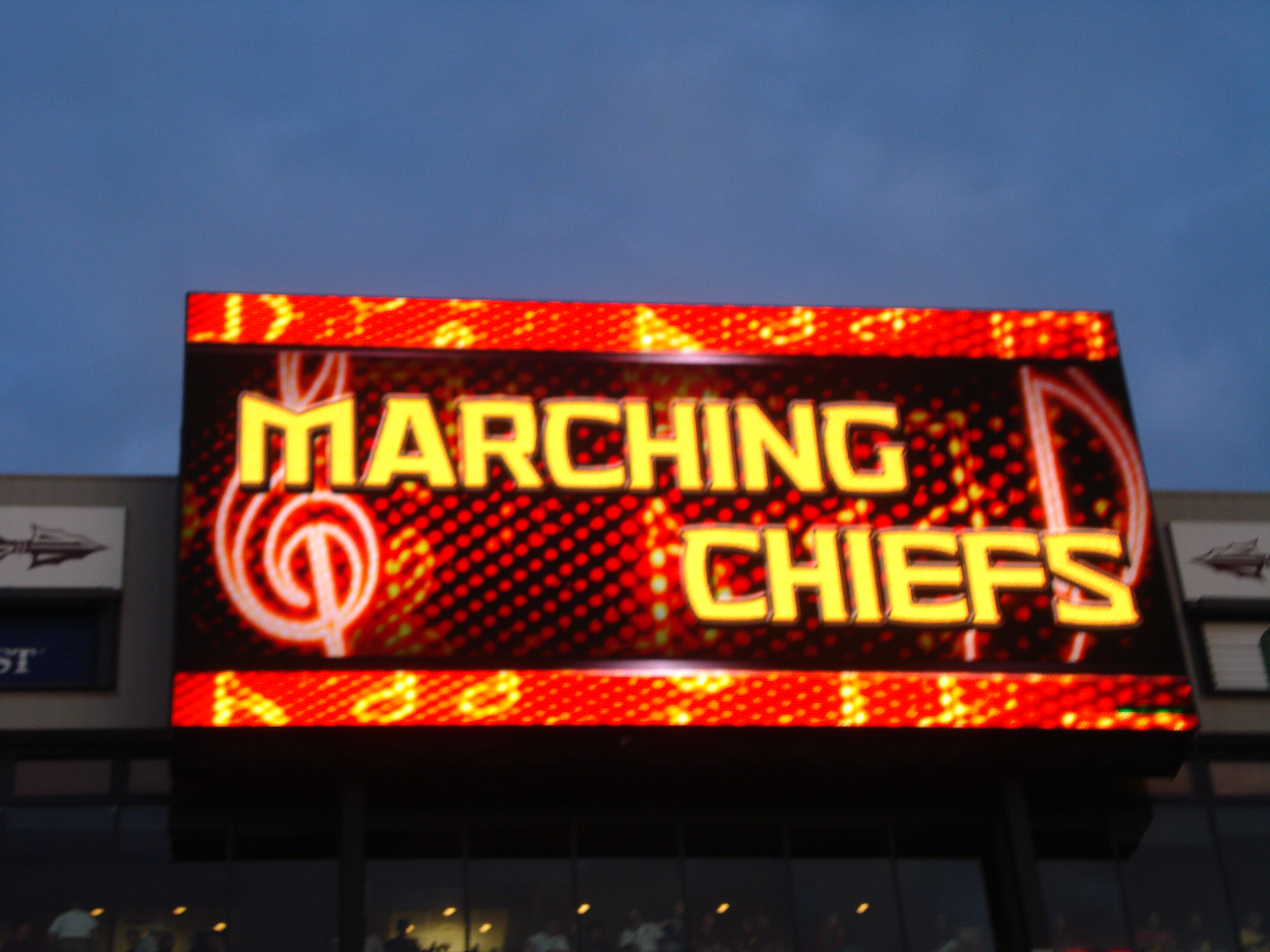
"Marching Chiefs" displayed on a Display Screen

Color guard auxiliary was added in 1970. The 1976 season marked the term of William Raxdale as director of the Chiefs. The step was introduced as part of an overall shift to a strict drum-and-bugle-corps aesthetic in which the Chiefs performed the same show at every game during the '76 football season. While the overall philosophy was not retained, the glide step introduced in that season is still used as a contrasting marching style by the Chiefs.

In 1977 Bentley Shellahamer, a Chiefs alumnus, took over directorship. Shellahamer reinstated the Chiefs' characteristic style of marching while emphasizing flexibility and innovation in matching visuals to music. In 1978 Chiefs performed their second of many NFL performance during a game for the New Orleans Saints. Chiefs surpassed 300 members during the 1981 football season which was marked by a trip to Ohio State University. Dr. Whitcomb conducted the combined bands in a performance of "The Star-Spangled Banner", America's national anthem, which Dr. Shellahamer described as the "ultimate experience." 1981 was also the year that alumnus Dave Westberry took on the role of the "Voice of the Marching Chiefs." The next year Andre Arrouet became interim director while Dr. Shellahamer took leave to work on his doctorate at Ohio State.

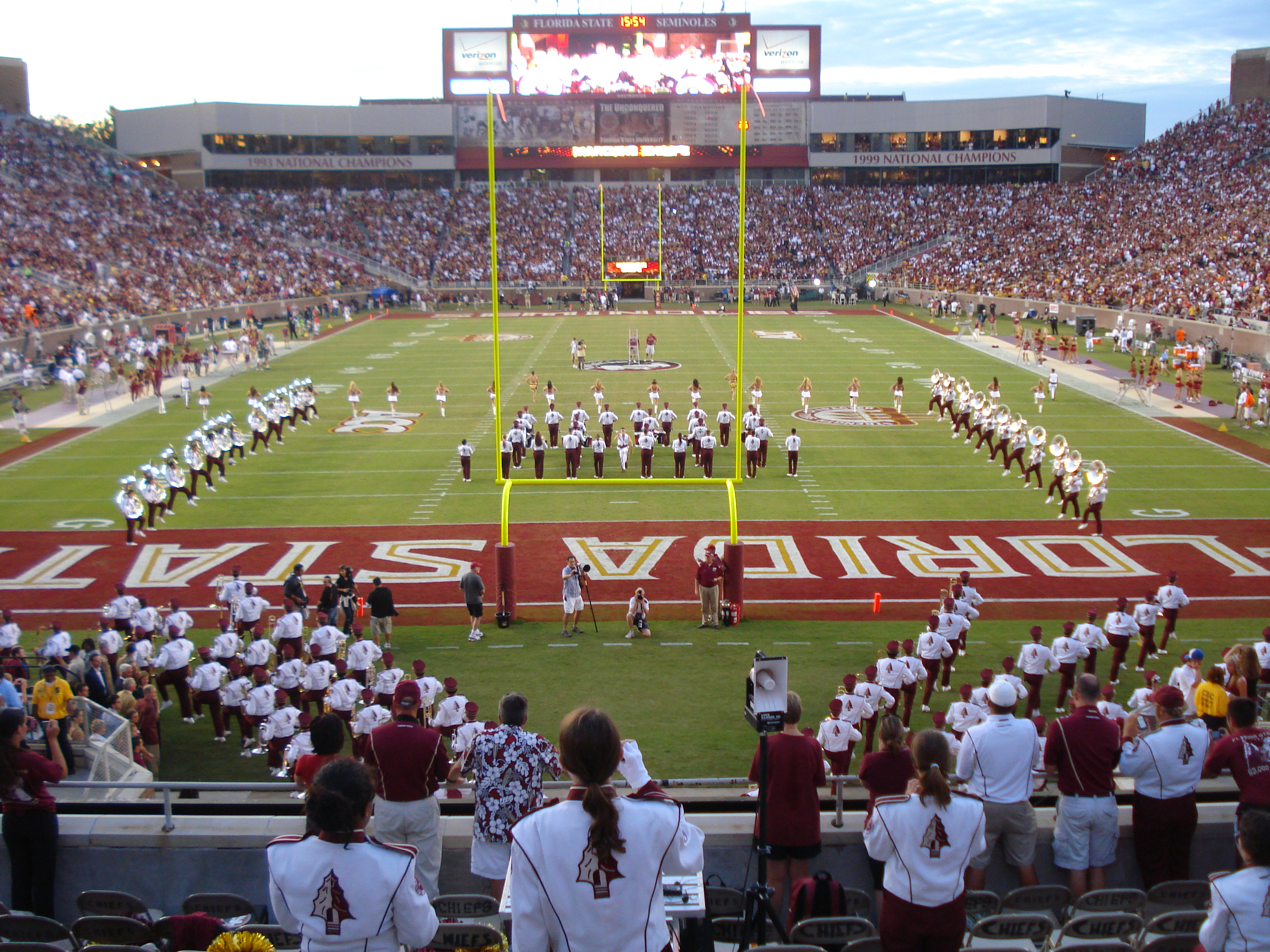
The Chiefs prepare for the Go Cadence at a pre-game show

In 1982, Sports Illustrated featured the Marching Chiefs in an eight-page photo spread. The magazine echoed a longstanding slogan of the Chiefs in declaring that "Florida State occasionally may lose a football game, but never a halftime show" (December 6, 1982). Also in 1982 was the addition of the yearly Prism Concert to be included with the annual Tri-State Band Festival and Conducting Conference. Dr. Shellahamer resumed directorship in 1984 and Chiefs, along with the Gator Band, performed at Super Bowl XVIII in Tampa, FL. 1988 saw the Marching Chiefs hit another membership milestone when it reached 400 students, thus making Chiefs the world's largest collegiate marching band. In 1989 Chiefs got a new director, Robert Sheldon, and new uniforms. Though not successful at the time, a campaign was launched by band members to designate the Chiefs' practice field "Manley Whitcomb Memorial Field."

1991 began the current era of the Marching Chiefs. Patrick Dunnigan gained directorship of the band and was instrumental in the production of the Chiefs' first CD, Our Best Foot Forward. Though currently commonplace, the CD was the first end-of-season CD recording of a college marching band. The next year was Charlie Carter's 40th year at FSU and was celebrated by a special halftime show in his honor. 1993 was another momentous year, beginning with a trip to East Rutherford, New Jersey for the Kickoff Classic against the University of Kansas Jayhawks. Doak Campbell Stadium was also renovated before this season including a section was added in the south end zone for the Chiefs and the new "Elephant Doors" underneath the section. The Homecoming Show celebrated 50 years of bands at FSU. To end the season the Marching Chiefs participated in FSU's first National Championship win over the University of Nebraska Cornhuskers.

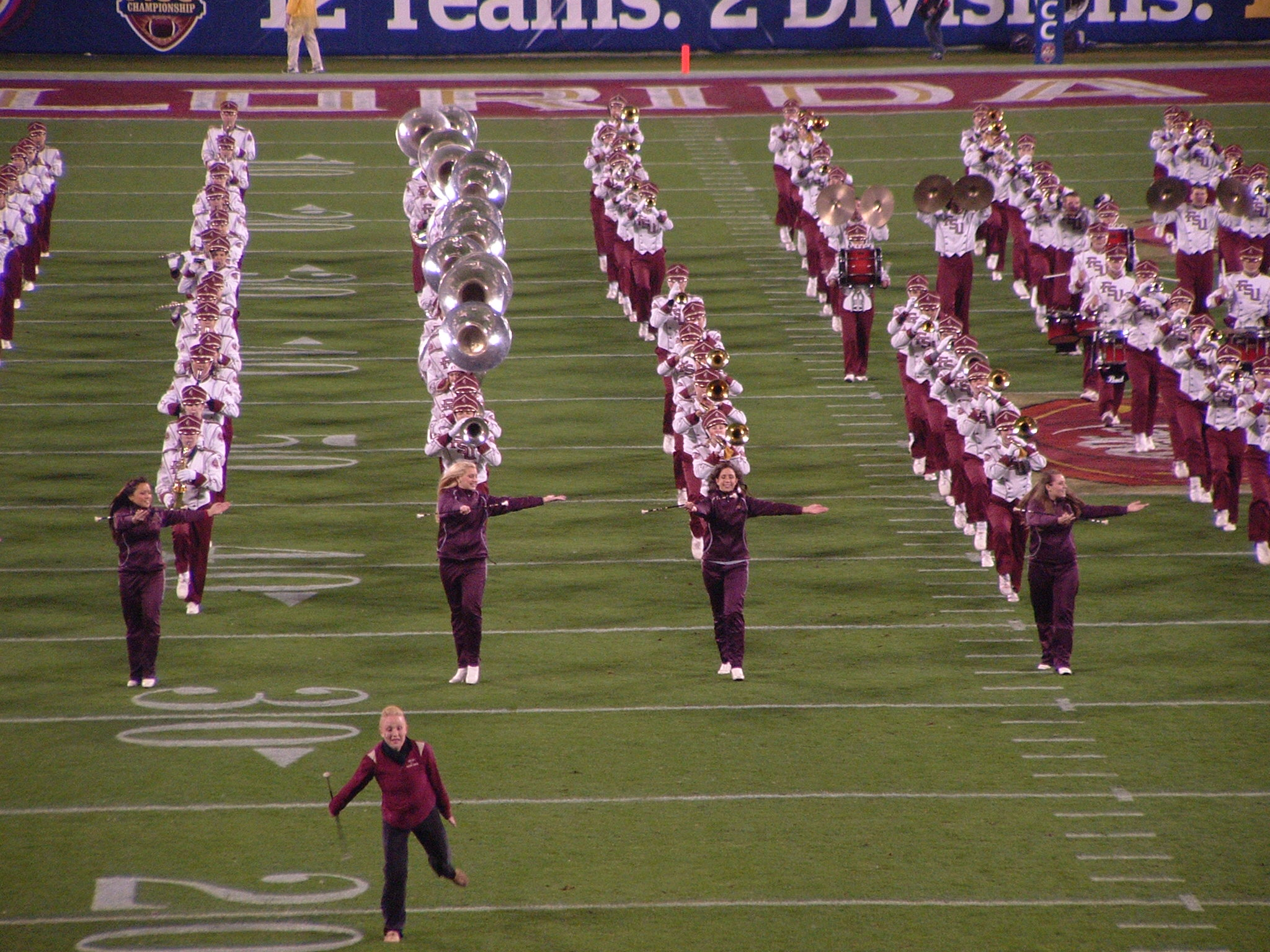
The Marching Chiefs prior to the 2010 ACC Championship Game

The Chiefs renewed their "world renowned" laurels in 1997 when they traveled to London, England to perform a halftime show for a game of the World Football League's London Monarchs. The following season Dunnigan took leave to pursue a doctorate at the University of Texas and Dr. John L. Baker served as interim director. In 1998 the Marching Chiefs found themselves heading to Tempe, Arizona for another shot at the National championship but lost to the Tennessee Volunteers in the Fiesta Bowl. The newly hooded Dr. Dunnigan returned for the 1999 season which ended with a National Championship win against the Virginia Tech Hokies in the Sugar Bowl.

In 2002 the Marching Chiefs' practice field was at last officially named in honor of Dr Manley Whitcomb. In 2005 a donation of over $350,000 was made to the university by Bill Harkins, former FSU lacrosse head coach, for a new practice field for The Florida State Lacrosse Team. This allowed Chiefs to start off the '05 season with a new, artificial-turf field for rehearsals. This field, Bill Harkins field at the Manley R. Whitcomb Band Complex, replicated the appearance of Bobby Bowden Field on game day as it appeared in 2005. The turf choice resulted from less-than-ideal conditions faced in rehearsals due to the previous natural grass surface. In 2009 The Marching Chiefs continued to set records in collegiate band size with 460 members.

Work on the Manley Whitcomb Band Complex was finally completed in time for the 2013 homecoming game. On November 15, 2013 the new field house and ceremonial arch were dedicated by Dr. Dunnigan. The new building will serve as storage facilities for the equipment that the Marching Chiefs use on a daily basis during marching season. As part of an effort to keep the band in tip-top condition, a fund was started in 2013 to replace many of the aging instruments loaned to students who don't own their own. When the 2013 Seminoles football team made it to the National Championship game the Marching Chiefs traveled with them to Pasadena for the Rose Bowl and contributed to the school's third national championship. In 2018, the Marching Chiefs were invited to perform at the 75th Anniversary of D-Day Parade in Normandy, reclaiming their "World-Renowned" Title. In 2027, the Marching Chiefs will become the first collegiate marching band from the state of Florida to perform in the Macy's Thanksgiving Day Parade.

== Try-outs and rehearsals ==
Aspiring members of the Marching Chiefs complete a week of Preseason Training that begins with a music audition. Following the music audition is a process of learning how to march as a Chief for rookies and a three-day refresher for veterans. After being taught how to march, the week concludes with the marching audition. The playing audition and marching audition each account for 50% of the total audition score which assists in completing the official Marching Chiefs "Block List." Anyone who wishes to be a member of the Marching Chiefs in a given year, new and returning, must audition to be in the band each year.

The band institutes an "alternator" system due to the number of members and the limitations of drill. Members declared alternates share their field position with another member and perform the pregame and/or halftime show every other football game. The number of alternates varies by section and by year.

Marching Chiefs rehearse for two hours on Monday through Friday from 4pm to 6pm. On game days, the band has early morning Continuity rehearsals to review the halftime show and pregame.

== Drum majors ==
Head Drum Majors and Assistant Drum Majors of the Marching Chiefs fulfill ceremonial as well as musical positions of leadership within the band. One of the most significant and visible responsibilities of the Drum Major is the pre-game strut, which includes a 40-yard strut and mace routine prior to the beginning of the Marching Chiefs' pre-game show. This tradition began with Jim Bruce during his tenure as Drum Major in the late 1970s. Over the years, Marching Chiefs added the position of Assistant Drum Major (and later a second) to serve as an additional field commander and conductor. For halftime and special appearances, the Drum Major dresses in a formal uniform designed in the likeness of the Seminole Tribe of Florida, incorporating designs and colors representative of traditional tribal patchwork and attire. The head drum major for the 2026–27 season is Hunter Fisher.

Season	Head Drum Major	Assistant Drum Major	Assistant Drum Major
1942	Marion Swanson		
1953	Richard Mayo		
1954	Richard Mayo		
1955	Tony Swain		
1957	Terry Johnson		
1958	Terry Johnson		
1960	Bennett Shelfer		
1963	Roger McClendon	Matt Straub	
1964	Roger McClendon	Matt Straub	
1965	Camp Kirkland		
1966	Camp Kirkland		
1967	Herschel Beazley		
1968	Herschel Beazley		
1969	Herschel Beazley		
1971	George Rosete		
1972	Tom Drick		
1973	Tom Drick		
1974	Robert Duke		
1975	Robert Duke		
1976	Chris Dickinson		
1977	James Bruce		
1978	James Bruce		
1979	James Bruce	John Alton Thompson	
1980	Ken Williams	Craig Lawrence	
1981	Ken Williams	Joe Bowens	
1982	Keith Peterson	William Faucett	
1983	Bill Faucett	Joseph Little	
1984	Bill Faucett	Rodney Dorsey	
1985	Rodney Dorsey	Paige McKay	
1986	Rodney Dorsey	Steven Oser	
1987	Rodney Dorsey	Mary Lyle Scott	
1988	Tyrone Adkins	Claudine Cacioli	
1989	Tyrone Adkins	Claudine Cacioli	
1990	Claudine Cacioli	Gregory Johns	
1991	Rojay Evans	Gregory Johns	
1992	Gregory Johns	Jonathan Schwartz	
1993	Jonathan Schwartz	Daniel Oser	
1994	Michael Chiaro	Brad Wharton	
1995	Amie Benedetto	Eric Allen	
1996	Brad Wharton	Eric Allen	Amie Benedetto
1997	Eric Allen	David Hedgecoth	Kelly Monroe
1998	David Hedgecoth	Cindy Henman	Ernesta Suarez
1999	Chad Temple^{1}	Jeremy Brewer	Jonathan Richards
2000	Jonathan Richards	Jason Millhouse	Charlie Rankin
2001	Jason Millhouse	Gabriel Arnold	Troy Paolantonio
2002	Gabriel Arnold	Jason Millhouse	Jonathan Richards
2003	Ryan Kelly	Jessey Howard	Joey Monahan
2004	Jessey Howard	Christopher Cannon	Christina Dimitry
2005	Christopher Cannon	Jeff Chamlis	David Jackson
2006	David Thornton	Jeff Chamlis	Mark Shilling
2007	Mark Shilling	Jodi Chapman	Daniel Farr
2008	Daniel Farr	Jodi Chapman	Philip Magyar
2009	Michael Weintraub	Daniel Taylor	Andrew Vrzal
2010	Jennifer Mammino	Brittni Bailey	Andrew Dubbert
2011	Andrew Dubbert	Keith Griffis	Bradley Parks
2012	Keith Griffis	Bradley Parks	Daniel Rosman
2013	Daniel Rosman	Revae Douglas	Michael Keogh
2014	Daniel Rosman	Michael Keogh	Matthew Tenore
2015	Matthew Tenore	Charles Kelly	Jennifer Wright
2016	Matthew Tenore	Theodore Branson	Mia Hartley
2017	Aaron Meitz	Alex Arbeiter	Emilia Addeo
2018	Alex Arbeiter	Emilia Addeo	Katie Olney
2019	Alex Arbeiter	Steven Foster	Jordan Fraze
2020	Jordan Fraze	Brandon Matulonis	Jamie Miyagawa
2021	Jordan Fraze	Jamie Miyagawa	Sara Feingold
2022	Samantha Maltagliati	Kanoka Palmer	John Justice
2023	John Justice	Carly Davis	Mark Stevens
2024	Mark Stevens	Matthew Morejon	Kate Curley
2025	Kate Curley	Hunter Fisher	Kai Okamoto
2026	Hunter Fisher	Kai Okamoto	Makenna Payne

^{1}did not complete season

== Sections ==
The Marching Chiefs' instrumental sections are known by its members by their own specific names and are as follows:

Flutes & Piccolos: "Crowns"

Clarinets:"Pieces"

Alto & Tenor Saxophones: "Section X"

Mellophones: "HornZ"

Trumpets: "Screech"

Baritones & Euphoniums: "T.O.N.E." commonly referred to as "Tones"

Trombones: "The Roamin' Bones," commonly referred to as "Bones"

Sousaphones: "The Royal Flush," commonly referred to as "Flush"

Percussion: "The Big 8 Drumline," commonly referred to as "Big 8”

Auxiliary consists of Color Guard, Majorettes and Feature Twirler(s)

Majorettes, commonly referred to as "Rettes"

Each section has its own set of history and traditions, some with their own colors, mottos, symbols, songs, pre-game rituals and/or crests.

== FSU Marching Chiefs traditions ==
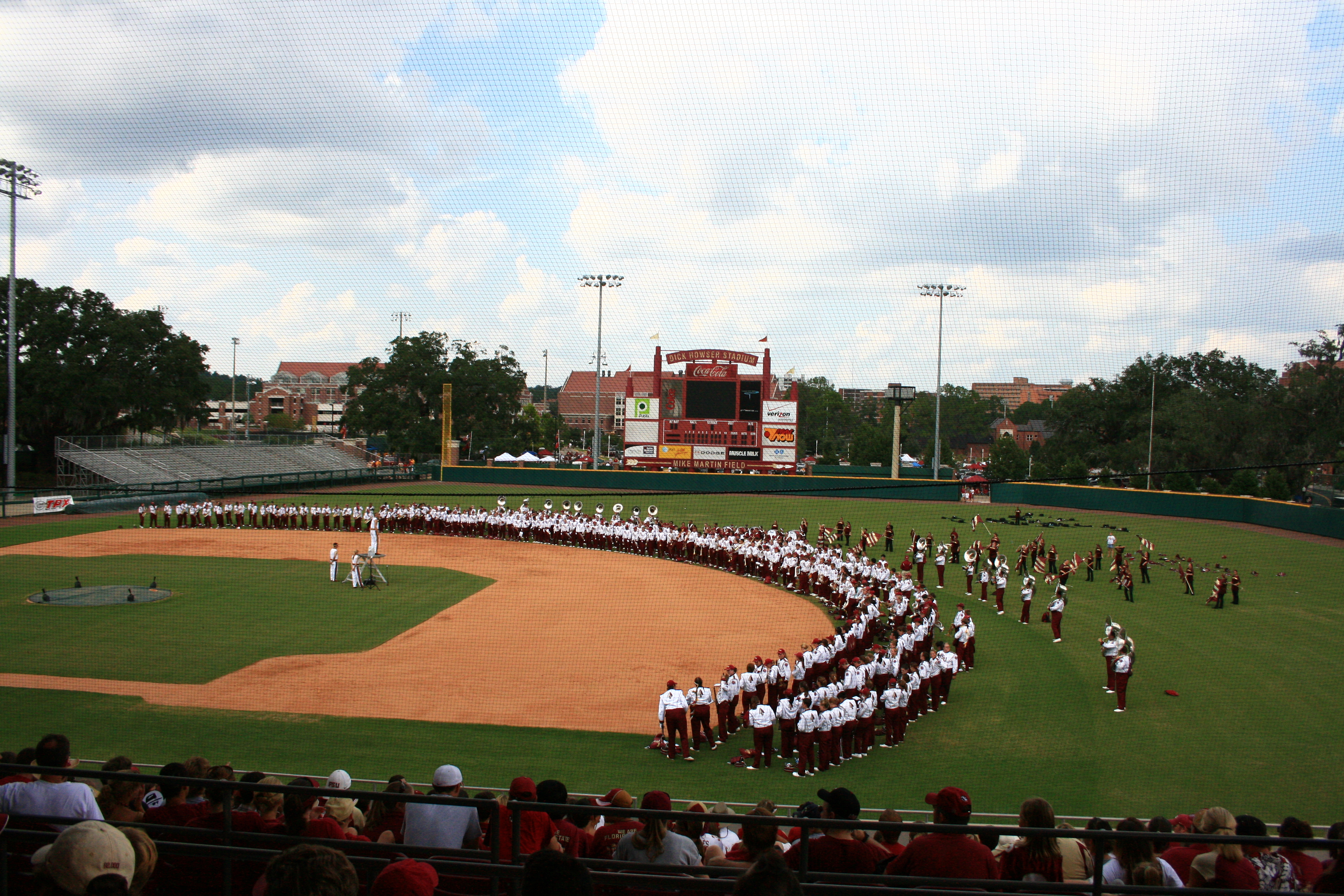
Skull Session takes place before every home game.

"Skull Session" - The Chiefs perform together at a pregame "Skull Session" before each home football game in Tallahassee. When Manley Whitcomb came to Florida State University from Ohio State University he brought several traditions with him, one of those being the "Skull Session." The session allows members to rehearse the musical program before the game to "get the music into their skulls", enabling greater focus on marching and visual execution during the performance itself. Originally, held in the Opperman Music Hall, Skull Session has since become a public event. The Chiefs now perform on Mike Martin Field at Dick Howser Stadium, adjacent to Doak Campbell Stadium, where they perform section cheers followed by a preview of the halftime show. Section cheers tend to be either well-known pop songs, satirical takes on rival schools or opposing sections, and in-jokes familiar to members and alumni.

"Come On and Go" - This is the band's traditional pregame opener. The drumline begins by playing the cadence "Come On and Go" as the band "Chief Steps" out onto the field from under the stadium. As the cadence progresses, the band performs a double-time high step known as "Go Cadence" onto the field.

"The Good, The Bad and The Ugly" - A tradition started in the early 1980s under the direction of Dr. Bentley Shellahamer. As the Florida State football team was finishing its on-field pre-game warm-up routine, the Chiefs joined the team's vocals. As they finished, the players lined up shoulder to shoulder on the fifty-yard line, held up their helmets and walked in a side-by-side line toward the North end zone as the Chiefs played the "main title" theme from the 1966 film "The Good, The Bad and The Ugly" which has been arranged into "G.B.U.", an extended intro which then leads into the playing of the "FSU Fight Song," or the "Warchant". This tradition was retired in 2010, and was reinstated for the 2020 Football Season.

"'Flushing' The Field" - The Royal Flush, during every pregame performance, "flushes" the field by running around the Seminole head logo at the center of Bobby Bowden Field while the head drum major stands at the center of it. As the rest of the band transitions to the team entrance formation, The Royal Flush circles the Seminole head. Once The Royal Flush finishes "Flushing" the field, the exit cadence ends. All of Marching Chiefs counts to 24, ending with "Flush".

"Roamin' The Stadium" - The Roamin' Bones "roam" the stadium during 3rd or 4th quarter and perform different arrangements from the Bone Book, their collection of musical charts written specifically for the Roamin' Bones.

"The Hymn To The Garnet & Gold" - When Florida State University sought an official alma mater, several composers sent in their contributions. The Hymn did not end up becoming the official alma mater, it has remained a longstanding school tradition, performed by the Marching Chiefs at the conclusion of every game.

"The War Chant" - Before every home game, the Marching Chiefs play the War Chant as Chief Osceola rides out on his horse Renegade while holding the Flaming Spear. Spectators accompany the chant with the Tomahawk Chop arm motion. The War Chant is also performed by the Marching Chiefs following defensive plays during games. As a result, the War Chant has become closely associated with the Florida State Seminoles football program.

== See also ==
- Florida State Seminoles
- History of Florida State University
