= Florida State Seminoles =

Florida State University sports team

- University: Florida State University
- Nickname: Noles
- NCAA: Division I (FBS)
- Conference: Atlantic Coast Conference (primary); Big 12 (beach volleyball)
- Athletic director: Jeff Purinton
- Location: Tallahassee, Florida
- First season: 1901
- Varsity teams: 19 (8 men's, 11 women's)
- Football stadium: Bobby Bowden Field at Doak S. Campbell Stadium
- Basketball arena: Donald L. Tucker Center
- Baseball stadium: Mike Martin Field at Dick Howser Stadium
- Softball stadium: Seminole Softball Complex
- Soccer stadium: Seminole Soccer Complex
- Aquatics center: Morcom Aquatics Center
- Tennis venue: Scott Speicher Memorial Tennis Center
- Other venues: Apalachee Regional Park; Don Veller Seminole Golf Course; Mike Long Track; Tully Gymnasium
- Colors: Garnet and gold
- Mascot: Osceola and Renegade, Cimarron
- Fight song: Florida State University Fight Song
- Website: seminoles.com

Team NCAA championships
- 12

Individual and relay NCAA champions
- 40

Atlantic Coast Conference logo in Florida State's colors

The Florida State Seminoles are the athletic teams representing Florida State University (FSU) located in Tallahassee, Florida. They compete as a member of the National Collegiate Athletic Association (NCAA) Division I, primarily competing in the Atlantic Coast Conference (ACC) for all sports since the 1991–92 season; within the Atlantic Division in any sports split into a divisional format since the 2005–06 season.

The Seminoles' athletic department currently fields 18 varsity teams, including programs for both men and women. They have collectively won 21 team national championships and over 100 team conference championships, as well as numerous individual national and conference titles.

The athletic department is led by athletic director Jeff Purinton, who reports to FSU President Richard D. McCullough and the Board of Trustees.

== Overview ==
Florida State Athletics were founded in 1902 when the then-Florida State College football teams played three seasons. The 1905 Buckman Act reorganized the existing seven Florida colleges into three institutions, segregated by race and gender. As a result of this reorganization, the coeducational Florida State College was renamed the Florida State College for Women. The Florida State University again became a co-ed institution in 1947 with most of the newly enrolled male students back from service in World War II. Athletic programs resumed and Florida State fielded its first football team in 43 years with FSU facing Stetson on October 18, 1947.

Florida State was a founding member of the Dixie Conference, in 1948, when other southern institutions sought to create a "purely amateur" athletic conference based on the principle of complete amateurism, with no athletic scholarships. Three years later, Florida State left the conference to become an independent, having won ten conference titles including three in football and two in men's track and field.

In 1976, Florida State joined the Metro Conference for all sports except football, which remained independent. For fifteen years FSU competed and won sixty-eight conference titles as well as five national titles including two in softball, two in women's track and field, and one in women's golf.

Since 1991, Florida State has been a member of the Atlantic Coast Conference. Since joining the conference, FSU has won ninety-six ACC titles and nine national titles including three in football, three in men's track and field, two in soccer, and one in softball. After the 2005 conference expansion was finished, FSU was placed in the newly formed Atlantic Division. The ACC discontinued divisions in 2023.

Garnet	Gold	Black	White

Florida State's school colors of garnet and gold are a merging of the university's past. In 1904 and 1905, the Florida State College won football championships wearing purple and gold uniforms. When FSC became Florida State College for Women in 1905, the FSCW student body selected crimson as the official school color. The administration in 1905 took crimson and combined it with the recognizable purple of the championship football teams to achieve the color garnet. The garnet and gold colors were first used on an FSU uniform in a 14–6 loss to Stetson on October 18, 1947.

On April 11, 2014, as part of the university's rebranding of the program, white and black were added to the official school colors. The addition of the two colors is to better represent the colors present on the flag of the Seminole Tribe of Florida. Florida State also uses turquoise on special occasions in various sports to honor the Seminole Tribe as the color represents "harmony, friendship, and fellowship" within Native American culture.

=== Mascot ===
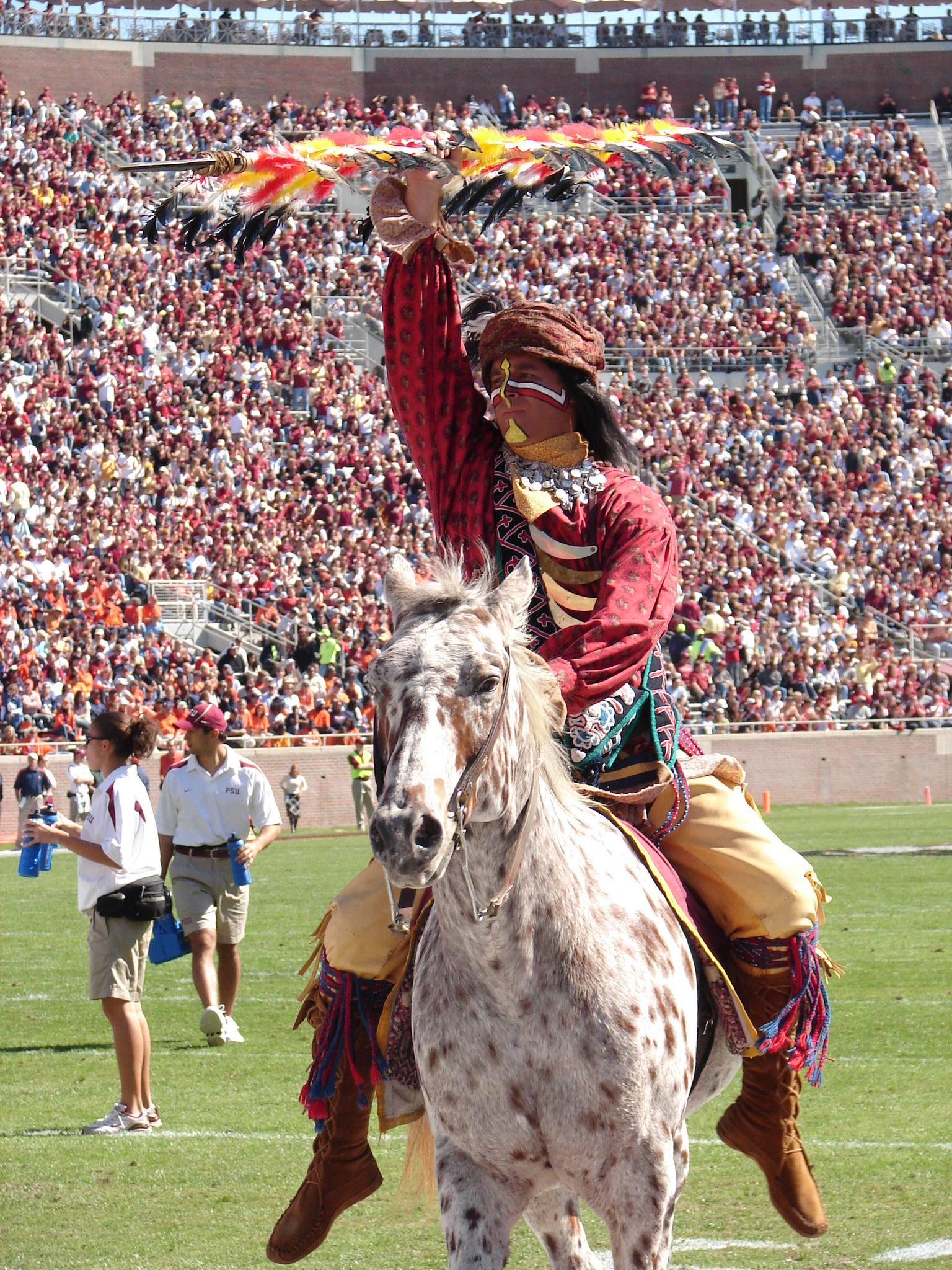
Osceola and Renegade serve as the symbols of Florida State Athletics.

==== History ====
The name "Seminoles" was chosen by students in 1947 on a vote, it alludes to Florida's Seminole people who in the early nineteenth century resisted efforts of the United States government to remove them from Florida. Since 1978 the teams have been represented by the symbols Osceola and Renegade. The symbol represents an actual historical figure, Seminole war leader Osceola, whose clothing represents appropriate period dress. The athletic logo, in use since the early 1970s, shows a profile of a shouting Seminole warrior in circle. The model for the logo was Florida State music faculty member Thomas Wright, composer of the Florida State University Fight Song and Victory Song.

The university maintains that they do not officially have a mascot, but use the Seminole name in "admiration" of the unconquered tribe. However, the figures of Osceola and Renegade, as well as the athletic logo, are used in a way that is indistinguishable from other mascots; they are used to rally the crowd at sporting events, and emblazoned on T-shirts and other merchandise.

Renegade and Osceola are reserved for football games; therefore, the Seminoles use a different symbol for other athletic events. This symbol, referred to by the university as an "ambassador" rather than a mascot, is an anthropomorphic horse named Cimarron. The name Cimarron comes from a term used by Spanish colonizers to describe independent indigenous tribes.

==== Controversy ====
The use of names and images associated with Seminole history is officially sanctioned by the Seminole Tribal Council of Florida. In 2005, the Tribal Council produced a written resolution affirming their support for the use of their symbolism, and FSU states that they take pride in their "continued collaboration with the tribe".

In 2005, the NCAA adopted a policy intended to prevent their schools and athletic programs from using mascots and imagery that are "hostile or abusive" to racial and ethnic minorities. This included Native American mascots, and FSU was specifically flagged by the NCAA as a university with potentially offensive imagery. However, Florida State challenged the policy and was granted a waiver based on their "unique relationship" with the Seminole Tribe of Florida. The NCAA allows the use even though the NCAA "continues to believe the stereotyping of Native Americans is wrong."

Though the Florida Seminole Tribal Council made this agreement, they only represent Florida's portion of the Seminole people. In 2013, the Seminole Nation of Oklahoma, which has about four times as many registered members as Florida's Seminole tribe, passed a resolution condemning the use of such imagery on sports teams, making no exception for the kind of agreement FSU made with the Seminole Tribe of Florida. Their statement reads, "the use of American Indian mascots, images, and religious symbols is harmful to all children, and is discriminatory to Native cultures, Native imagery, and violates religious icons". The American Psychological Association has made similar statements about the negative effects of Indigenous mascots, arguing that they promote stereotypes, establish a hostile environment, and undermine the Nations' ability to accurately represent their culture. Students and other members of the Florida State community have also argued against the use of Native imagery, posting about it on school blogs and starting a Change.org petition in August 2021 to "ban racist traditions at FSU".

=== Rivalries ===
Florida State maintains two traditional rivalries in all sports with the Florida Gators and the Miami Hurricanes. Florida State is the only school in the state to play both Florida and Miami each year in all sports.

Florida State developed a football rivalry with Clemson after joining the Atlantic Coast Conference. Tommy Bowden was named the head coach at Clemson prior to the 1999 season, and with his father Bobby Bowden the head coach at Florida State, the game was nicknamed the Bowden Bowl for the duration of his tenure.

Florida State University was founded with money donated by Francis Eppes VII, a grandson of Thomas Jefferson, the third President of the United States (1801–1809), principal author of the Declaration of Independence (1776), and founder of the University of Virginia. As a result, both teams play for the Jefferson-Eppes Trophy in football. With the realignment of the ACC, the Seminoles and Cavaliers found themselves in different divisions and no longer play annually.

Florida State has baseball rivalries with its traditional opponents, as well as with the Jacksonville University Dolphins.

=== Athletic directors ===
Florida State has had 19 athletic directors in its history.

- Howard Danford, 1947–1956
- Tom Nugent, 1957–1958
- Perry Moss, 1959
- Vaughn Mancha, 1959–1971
- Clay Stapleton, 1971–1973
- John Bridgers, 1973–1979
- Phil Fordyce, 1979–1981
- Cecil Ingram, 1981–1989
- Bob Goin, 1990–1994
- Wayne Hogan, 1994
- Dave Hart Jr., 1995–2007
- William L. Proctor, 2007–2008
- Randy Spetman, 2008–2013
- Vanessa Fuchs, 2013 (interim)
- Stan Wilcox, 2013–2018
- David Coburn, 2018–2022
- Michael Alford, 2022–2026
- Bruce Warwick, 2026 (interim)
- Jeff Purinton, 2026–present

== Teams ==
Men's sports	Women's sports
Baseball	Basketball
Basketball	Beach volleyball
Cross country	Cross country
Football	Golf
Golf	Soccer
Swimming and diving	Softball
Tennis	Swimming and diving
Track and field^{†}	Tennis
	Track and field^{†}
	Volleyball
	Lacrosse
† – Track and field includes both indoor and outdoor

Florida State University sponsors teams in eight men's and eleven women's NCAA sanctioned sports, generally as a member of the Atlantic Coast Conference. Florida State competes as a member of the Coastal Collegiate Sports Association in beach volleyball.

=== Baseball ===
Head coach
Link Jarrett	5th season
Dick Howser Trophy winners
Player	Year
J. D. Drew	1997
Buster Posey	2008
Alex Lodise	2025

Florida State's baseball program is one of the most successful in collegiate sports, having been to twenty-four College World Series (CWS) in sixty-two Tournament appearances, and having appeared in the national championship final on three occasions, (falling to the USC Trojans in 1970, the Arizona Wildcats in 1986, and the Miami Hurricanes in 1999).

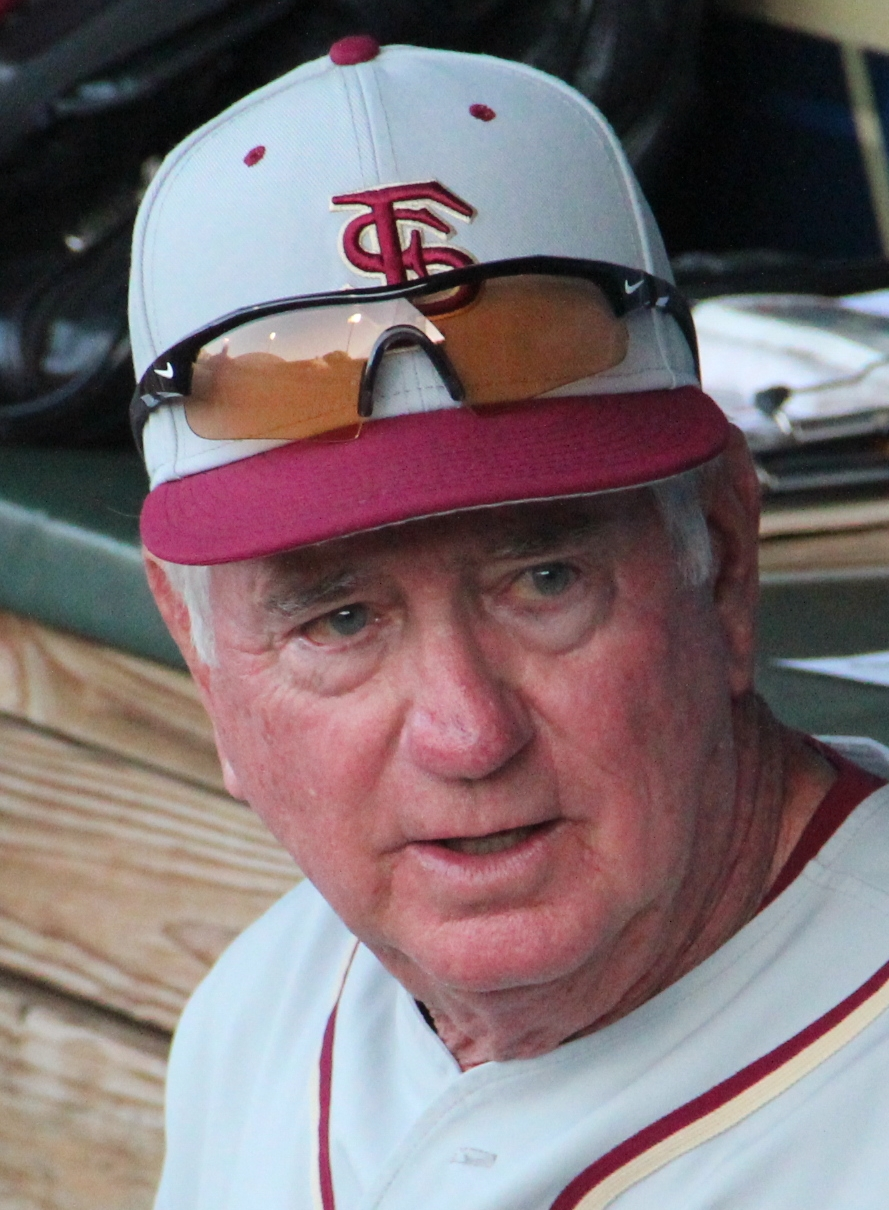
Mike Martin is the winningest coach in college baseball history with 2,029 wins.

Under the command of Head Coach No. 11 Mike Martin for forty years, Florida State is the second-winningest program in the history of college baseball. Since 1990, the Seminoles have had more 50 win seasons, been to more NCAA Tournaments and finished in the top 10 more than any other team in the country. Since 2000, FSU is the winningest program in college baseball with more victories and a higher winning percentage in the regular season than any other school. Despite their success, Florida State is still chasing their first CWS Championship, and has the most appearances in the CWS of any program yet to win a national title.

NCAA CWS appearances	1957, 1962, 1963, 1965, 1970. 1975, 1980, 1986, 1987, 1989, 1991, 1992, 1994, 1995, 1996, 1998, 1999, 2000, 2008, 2010, 2012, 2017, 2019, 2024
ACC tournament champions	1995, 1997, 2002, 2004, 2010, 2015, 2017, 2018
ACC regular-season champions	1996, 1998, 1999, 2001, 2002, 2003, 2007, 2009, 2012
ACC Atlantic Division Champions	2007, 2008, 2009, 2010, 2011, 2012, 2013, 2014

=== Basketball ===
==== Men's basketball ====
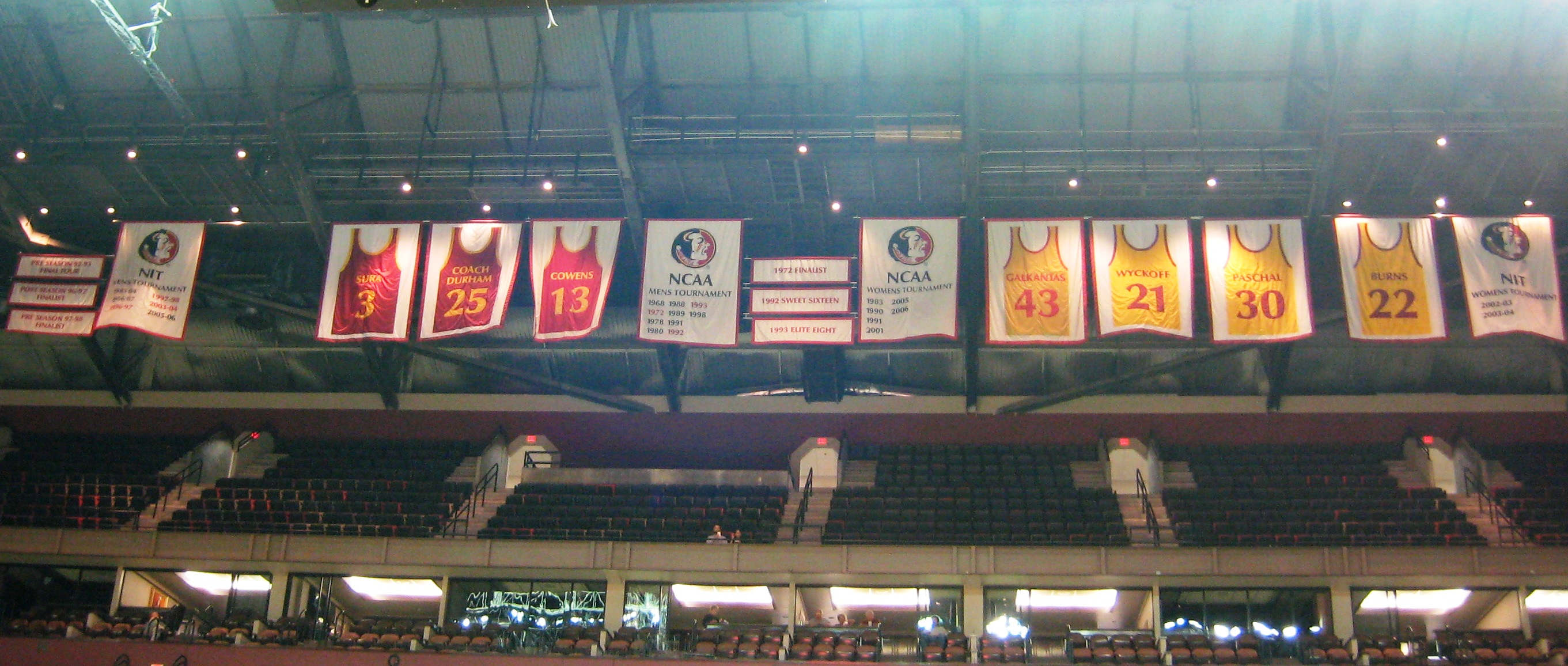
Banners hanging at the Donald L. Tucker Civic Center

Head coach
Luke Loucks		2nd season
Seminoles Men's Retired Numbers
No.	Player	Year
13	Dave Cowens	1968–70
Seminoles Men's Honored Numbers
No.	Player	Year
3	Bob Sura	1992–95
10	Sam Cassell	1991–93
25	Hugh Durham	1957–59
43	Dave Fedor	1960–62
33	Ron King	1971–73

Florida State's basketball program has enjoyed modest success since their first appearance in the NCAA tournament in 1968. Since then, the Seminoles have made eighteen tournament appearances, played for the national title in the NCAA championship game in 1972, advanced to the Sweet Sixteen round in 1992, 2011, 2019 and 2021, the Elite Eight round in 1993 and 2018, and won the ACC title in 2012.

A total of 45 Seminoles have been selected in the NBA draft with nine first-round picks. Among those first round selections are Dave Cowens, and George McCloud, the first lottery selection in school history.

NCAA tournament appearances	1968, 1972, 1978, 1980, 1988, 1989, 1991, 1992, 1993, 1998, 2009, 2010, 2011, 2012, 2017, 2018, 2019, 2021
NIT appearances	1984, 1987, 1997, 2004, 2006, 2007, 2008, 2013, 2014, 2016
ACC regular-season champions	2020
ACC tournament champions	2012

==== Women's basketball ====
Head coach
Brooke Wyckoff		6th season
Seminoles Women's Retired Numbers
No.	Player	Year
43	Sue Galkantas	1982–83
22	Wanda Burns	1987–91
30	Tia Paschal	1989–93
21	Brooke Wyckoff	1997–2001

The women's basketball program has made twenty-three tournament appearances. In the 2006–07 season, Florida State advanced to its first NCAA tournament Sweet Sixteen in school history. The Seminoles won the ACC regular season titles in 2009 and 2010. In 2010, the Seminoles made it to the Elite Eight round, the deepest advance in the tournament in program history, matching that run in 2015 and again in 2017.

NCAA tournament appearances	1983, 1990, 1991, 2001, 2005, 2006, 2007, 2008, 2009, 2010, 2011, 2013, 2014, 2015, 2016, 2017, 2018, 2019, 2021, 2022, 2023, 2024, 2025
WNIT appearances	1982, 2003, 2004
ACC regular-season champions	2009, 2010

=== Beach volleyball ===
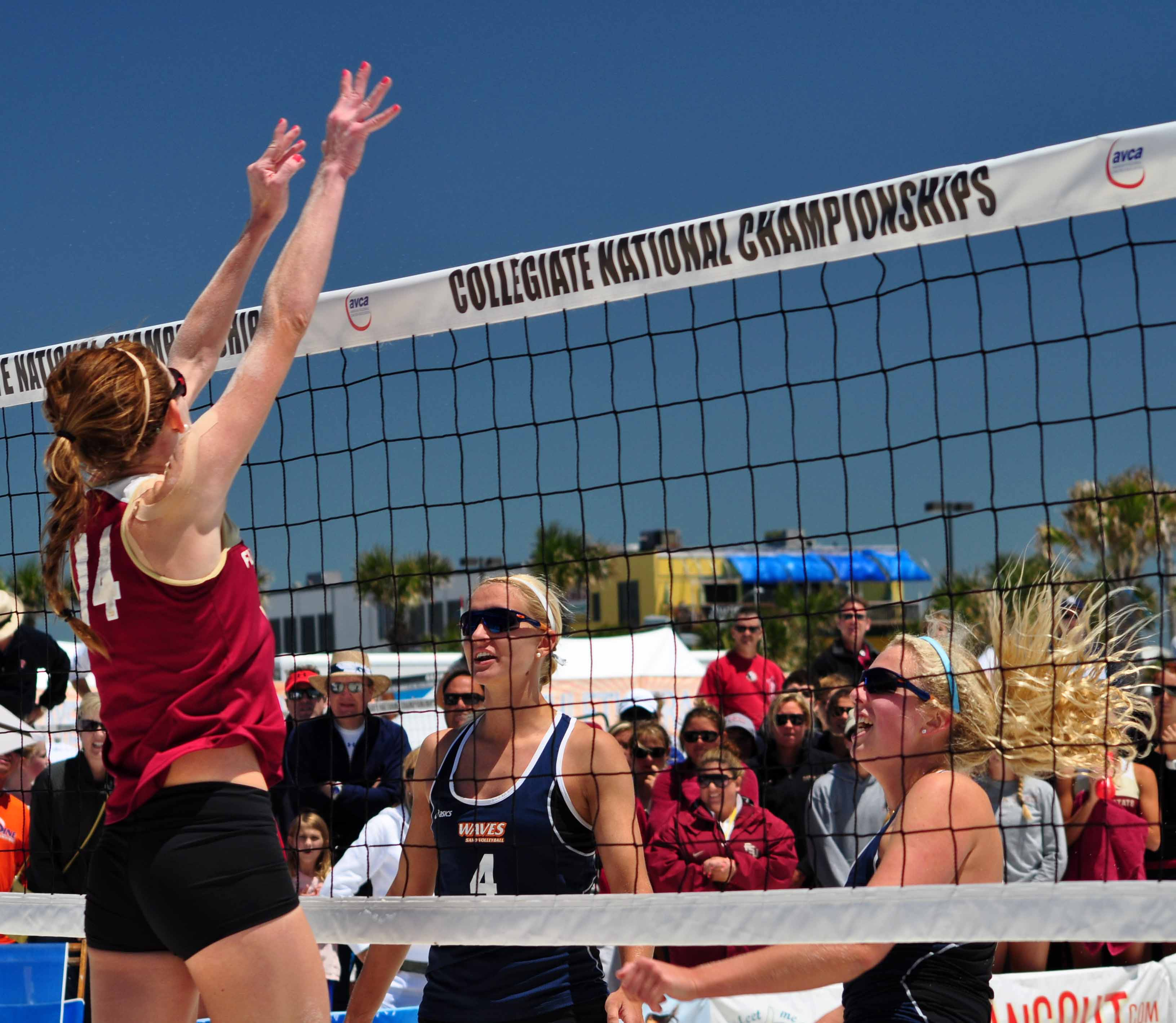
The Seminoles finished as national runner-up in the 2014, 2016, 2018, and 2022 seasons.

Head coach
Brooke Niles	12th season

Florida State added women's beach volleyball as a sport during the 2012 season, initially competing as part of the Coastal Collegiate Sports Association, and have been coached by Brooke Niles, who has been recognized as the AVCA National Coach of the Year and is the winningest coach in NCAA history, since 2016. They have appeared in four AVCA tournaments and ten NCAA tournaments since the program's inception, reaching the post-season every year. The team has won eight conference titles and reached the national championship on four occasions. Twenty-seven players have been recognized as All-Americans. The Seminoles currently compete in the Big 12 Conference.

NCAA tournament appearances	2016, 2017, 2018, 2019, 2021, 2022, 2023, 2024, 2025, 2026
AVCA tournament appearances	2012, 2013, 2014, 2015
CCSA regular-season champions	2016, 2017, 2018, 2019, 2021, 2024
CCSA tournament champions	2016, 2017, 2018, 2019, 2021, 2022, 2024
Big 12 regular-season champions	2026
Big 12 tournament champions	2026

=== Football ===
Head coach
Heisman Trophy winners
Player	Year
Charlie Ward	1993
Chris Weinke	2000
Jameis Winston	2013

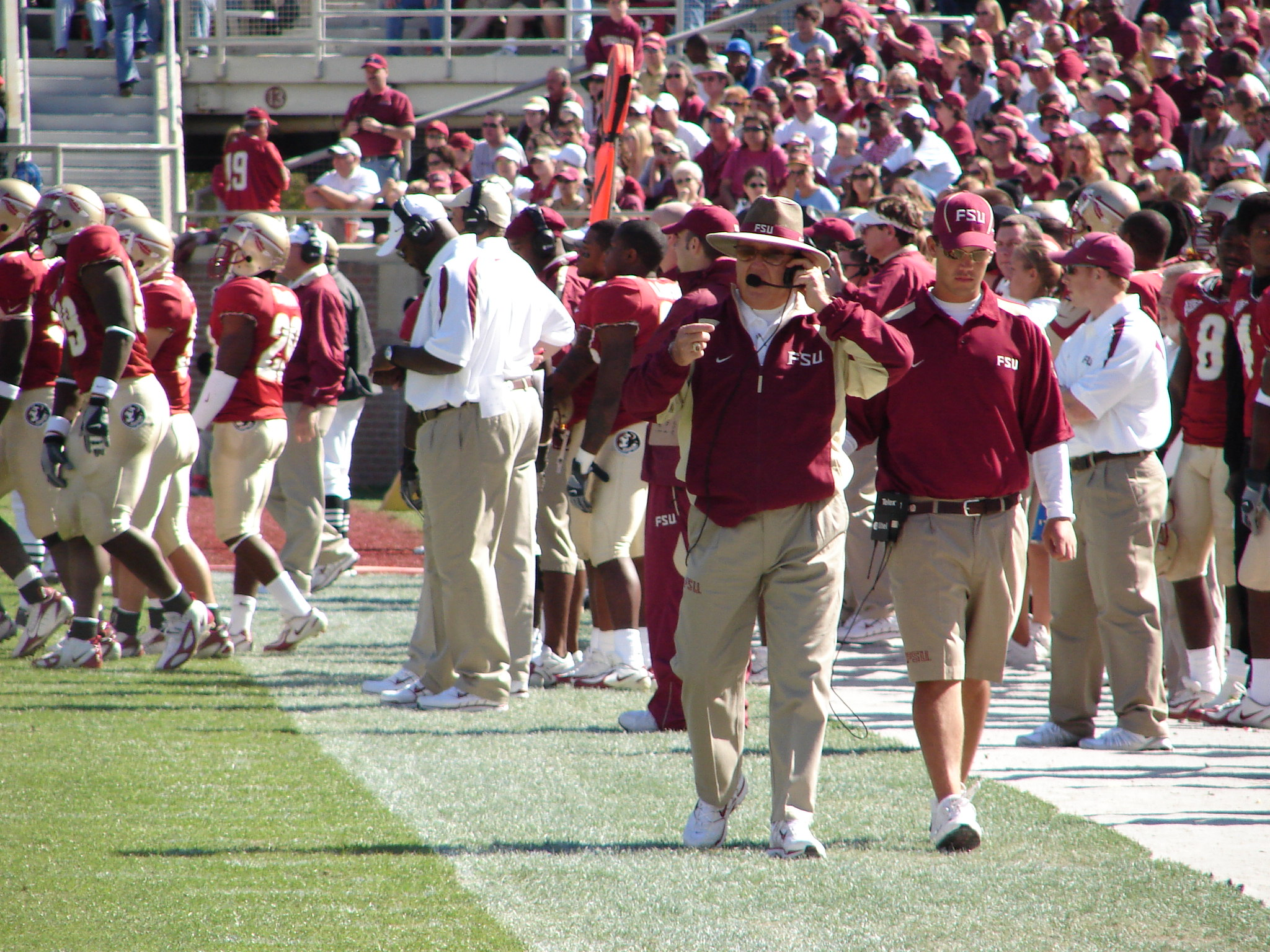
Hall of Fame coach Bobby Bowden on the sideline during the 2006 season

In 1902, the Florida State College in Tallahassee fielded its first varsity football team. The FSC program posted a record of 7–6–1 over the next three seasons, including a record of 3–1 against their rivals from the old University of Florida (formerly known as Florida Agricultural College) in Lake City. In 1904, the Florida State College football team became the first-ever state champions of Florida after beating both the University of Florida and Stetson University. In 1905, however, the Florida Legislature reorganized the state's higher education system by abolishing the existing state-supported colleges, and creating the new University of the State of Florida in Gainesville, and the new Florida State College for Women in Tallahassee. Many former Florida State College male students transferred to the new University of the State of Florida (renamed the University of Florida in 1909).

Following World War II, Florida State College for Women became coeducational and was renamed Florida State University in 1947, and the school once again started a football team. After its first season, FSU joined the Dixie Conference, which it won in each of the three years it was a member. It withdrew from the conference in 1951 and competed as an independent team for the next forty years.

Under head coach Bobby Bowden, the football team became one of the nation's most competitive football teams, greatly expanding the tradition of football at Florida State. The Seminoles played in five national championship games between 1993 and 2001, and have claimed the championship three times, in 1993, 1999, and 2013. The FSU football team was the most successful team in college football during the 1990s, boasting an 89% winning percentage. FSU also set an NCAA record for most consecutive Top 5 finishes in the AP football poll – receiving placement fourteen years in a row, from 1987 to 2000. The Seminoles were the first college football team in history to go wire-to-wire (ranked first place from preseason to postseason) since the AP began releasing preseason rankings in 1936. FSU also owns the record for most consecutive bowl game victories with 11 between 1985 and 1996 and made a post-season appearance for thirty-six straight seasons from 1982 to 2017. The Seminole football team has also won nineteen conference championships in the Dixie and Atlantic Coast.

Florida State's football program has produced many players who went on to NFL careers, including Fred Biletnikoff, Deion Sanders, Terrell Buckley, Derrick Brooks, Sebastian Janikowski, Walter Jones, Corey Simon, Anquan Boldin, Javon Walker, Warrick Dunn, Peter Boulware, Laveranues Coles, Brad Johnson, Samari Rolle, Peter Warrick, Jalen Ramsey, Dalvin Cook, Jameis Winston, Darnell Dockett, Dustin Hopkins, Graham Gano, Rodney Hudson, and many others; other notable players include Burt Reynolds and Lee Corso.

National champions	1993, 1999, 2013
Playoff appearances	2014
ACC Champions	1992, 1993, 1994, 1995, 1996, 1997, 1998, 1999, 2000, 2002, 2003, 2005, 2012, 2013, 2014, 2023
ACC Atlantic Division Champions	2005, 2008, 2010, 2012, 2013, 2014
Bowl victories	1950 Cigar Bowl, 1965 Gator Bowl, 1977 Tangerine Bowl, 1982 Gator Bowl, 1983 Peach Bowl, 1985 Gator Bowl, 1986 All-American Bowl, 1988 Fiesta Bowl, 1989 Sugar Bowl, 1990 Fiesta Bowl, 1990 Blockbuster Bowl, 1992 Cotton Bowl, 1993 Orange Bowl, 1994 Orange Bowl, 1995 Sugar Bowl, 1996 Orange Bowl, 1998 Sugar Bowl, 2000 Sugar Bowl, 2002 Gator Bowl, 2005 Gator Bowl, 2006 Emerald Bowl, 2008 Champs Sports Bowl, 2010 Gator Bowl, 2010 Chick-fil-A Bowl, 2011 Champs Sports Bowl, 2013 Orange Bowl, 2014 BCS National Championship, 2016 Orange Bowl, 2017 Independence Bowl, 2022 Cheez-It Bowl

=== Golf ===
==== Men's golf ====
The Seminoles have made forty NCAA tournament appearances including twenty-seven national championship appearances, finishing as runner-up in 2024, and nineteen regionals. Florida State has won thirteen conference championships. The Seminoles have appeared in sixteen straight NCAA tournaments and were the top seed in the 2015 tournament, a year in which they won a school record four straight in-season tournaments. In the 2021 season, John Pak won the Haskins Award, Hogan Award, and Nicklaus Award.

==== Women's golf ====
The Seminoles have made eight AIAW tournament appearances and thirty NCAA tournament appearances, including twenty-seven regionals and fourteen national championship appearances, advancing for ten consecutive years. Florida State has won four conference championships.

=== Women's soccer ===
Head coach
Brian Pensky	5th season
Hermann Trophy winner
Player	Year
Mami Yamaguchi	2007
Jaelin Howell	2020, 2021
Onyi Echegini	2023

Since adding soccer as a sport, Florida State has made twenty-seven appearances in the NCAA tournament and fifteen appearances in the College Cup. The Seminoles won national championships in 2014, 2018, 2021, 2023, and 2025 with additional national title appearances in 2007, 2013, and 2020.

NCAA Champions	2014, 2018, 2021, 2023, 2025
NCAA College Cup appearances	2003, 2005, 2006, 2007, 2011, 2012, 2013, 2014, 2015, 2018, 2020, 2021, 2022, 2023, 2025
NCAA tournament appearances	2000, 2001, 2002, 2003, 2004, 2005, 2006, 2007, 2008, 2009, 2010, 2011, 2012, 2013, 2014, 2015, 2016, 2017, 2018, 2019, 2020, 2021, 2022, 2023, 2024, 2025, 2026
ACC tournament champions	2011, 2013, 2014, 2015, 2016, 2018, 2020, 2021, 2022, 2023, 2024
ACC regular-season champions	2009, 2012, 2014, 2020, 2022, 2023

=== Softball ===
The softball team plays at the Seminole Softball Complex; the field is named for JoAnne Graf, the winningest coach in softball history. An 8–1 victory over Jacksonville on February 22, 2006, made her only the second coach in NCAA history to record 1,100 NCAA fast-pitch wins. In 1999, Florida State received a softball complex, which also houses the soccer stadium.

Head coach
Lonni Alameda	19th season
National Player of the Year winner
Player	Year
Jessica van der Linden	2004
Lacey Waldrop	2014
National Freshman of the Year winner
Player	Year
Jaysoni Beachum	2024

Florida State's accomplishments include two AIAW national championships, one NCAA national championship, twelve trips to the Women's College World Series, thirty-eight NCAA tournaments, forty-one All-Americans, and twenty conference titles, as well as forty-two forty win seasons.

For over two decades, FSU has been one of the most dominant softball programs in the history of collegiate softball. Only five teams in the history of the NCAA have been to more WCWS than Florida State and no school east of Arizona has been to more NCAA tournaments than the Seminoles. Florida State has made a regional appearance every year since 2000.

In 2015, Lacey Waldrop and Maddie O'Brien became the first players from the school to be drafted into the National Pro Fastpitch league and Jessica Burroughs became the school's first number one overall pick in 2017.

NCAA Champions	2018
AIAW Champions	1981, 1982
NCAA WCWS appearances	1987, 1990, 1991, 1992, 1993, 2002, 2004, 2014, 2016, 2018, 2021, 2023
ACC tournament champions	1992, 1993, 1995, 1996, 1997, 1998, 1999, 2000, 2003, 2004, 2011, 2014, 2015, 2016, 2017, 2018, 2019, 2022, 2023, 2026
ACC regular-season champions	1992, 1993, 1994, 1995, 1997, 1999, 2000, 2001, 2002, 2003, 2004, 2013, 2014, 2015, 2016, 2017, 2018, 2023, 2025, 2026
ACC Atlantic Division Champions	2018, 2019

=== Track and field ===
Head coach
Matt Kane	3rd season
Bowerman Award winner
Player	Year
Trey Cunningham	2022

The men's track and field team has won multiple NCAA national championships and ACC championships. In 2006, the team had individual champions in the 200 m (Walter Dix), the triple jump (Rafeeq Curry), and the shot put (Garrett Johnson). In 2007, Dix became the first person to hold the individual title in the 100 m, 200 m, and 4×100 m Relay at the same time.

=== Non-varsity/club teams ===
==== Cheerleading ====
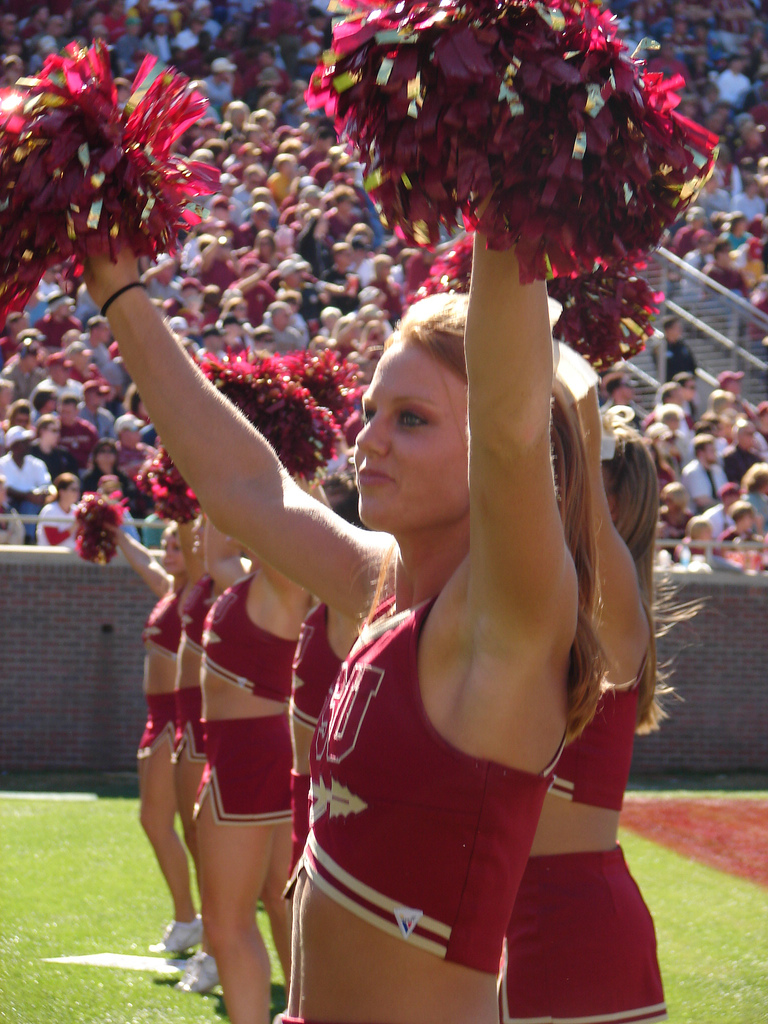
Florida State cheerleaders

The Florida State cheerleaders cheer at all football games as well as home basketball and volleyball games. The all-girl squad won the National Cheerleaders Association championship in 1997 and the co-ed squad won the Universal Cheerleaders Association championship in the small co-ed division in 2023. The dance team that performs at football and basketball games is known as the Golden Girls.

==== Rugby ====
The Florida State Rugby Football Club was founded in 1970, and plays Division 1 college rugby in the South Independent Rugby Conference, which is not affiliated with the NCAA. The Seminoles won the conference championship in 2012, defeating the University of Central Florida. FSU is led by head coach Michael Gomez.

== All-sports program rankings ==
=== NCAA all-sports rankings ===
Directors' Cup

Florida State Athletics has made great strides in the National Association of Collegiate Directors of Athletics (NACDA) standings in the last twenty years. Since joining the Atlantic Coast Conference, FSU has been ranked among the top fifty NCAA Division I athletic programs in the country. From the 2006–2007 through 2014–2015 academic years, Florida State cracked the top 15 every year, including two top 5 finishes in 2009–2010 and 2011–2012, and four top 10 finishes in 2010–2011, 2014–2015, 2017–2018, and 2018–2019.

NACDA All-Sports Rankings

Year	Rank
1993–94	25th
1994–95	24th
1995–96	24th
1996–97	49th
1997–98	46th

Year	Rank
1998–99	39th
1999–00	46th
2000–01	35th
2001–02	39th
2002–03	38th

Year	Rank
2003–04	22nd
2004–05	30th
2005–06	17th
2006–07	15th
2007–08	15th

Year	Rank
2008–09	15th
2009–10	5th
2010–11	9th
2011–12	5th
2012–13	11th

Year	Rank
2013–14	12th
2014–15	10th
2015–16	22nd
2016–17	13th
2017–18	9th

Year	Rank
2018–19	7th
2020–21	16th
2021–22	14th
2022–23	17th
2023–24	12th

Year	Rank
2024–25	28th
2025–26	41st

== National championships ==
Florida State has won twenty-one national team championships (including twelve sponsored by the NCAA), three by the Association for Intercollegiate Athletics for Women (AIAW), two by the Bowl Championship Series, and one by the Bowl Coalition), and its individual athletes have numerous individual NCAA national championships.

=== NCAA team championships ===
Florida State University has won 12 NCAA team national championships:

- Men's (4)
  - Gymnastics (2): 1951, 1952
  - Outdoor Track & Field (2): (Note: Does not include 2007 men's outdoor track and field championship, which was vacated) 2006, 2008
- Women's (8)
  - Indoor Track and Field (1): 1985
  - Outdoor Track and Field (1): 1984
  - Soccer (5): 2014, 2018, 2021, 2023, 2025
  - Softball (1): 2018

Florida State has been national runners-up 23 times in 12 NCAA sports: baseball (3), men's basketball (1), men's cross country (1), women's cross country (2), men's golf (1), women's golf (1), softball (2), women's soccer (3), men's indoor track and field (2), men's outdoor track and field (2), women's outdoor track and field (2), and beach volleyball (4).

=== Other national team championships ===
Below are the nine national team titles that were bestowed by other college athletics entities:

- Men's (6):
  - Football (3): 1993, 1999, 2013 (FBS)
  - Volleyball (3): 1955, 1957, 1958 (USVA)
- Women's (3):
  - Golf (1): 1981 (AIAW)
  - Softball (slowpitch) (2): 1981, 1982 (AIAW)

Florida State has been national runner-up two times in one NCAA sport (football) for which the NCAA itself does not bestow a championship.

=== Non-varsity/club national team championships ===
Women's (1):

- Cheerleading (1): 1997 (NCA)

Co-Ed (2):

- Gymnastics (1): 2022 (NAIGC)
- Cheerleading (1): 2023 (UCA)

Florida State has also been national runner-up once in one non-varsity club sport (cheerleading).

== Conference championships ==
Sport	Conference	Championship years	Number of championships
Baseball tournament	Atlantic Coast Conference	1995, 1997, 2002, 2004, 2010, 2015, 2017, 2018	8
Baseball tournament	Metro Conference	1977, 1980, 1981, 1983, 1984, 1985, 1986, 1987, 1988, 1989, 1990, 1991	12
Baseball tournament	Florida Intercollegiate	1956, 1957	2
Baseball tournament	Dixie Conference	1950	1
Baseball regular season	Metro Conference	1986, 1989, 1990, 1991	4
Baseball regular season	Atlantic Coast Conference	1996, 1998, 1999, 2001, 2003, 2007, 2009, 2012	8
Men's basketball tournament	Atlantic Coast Conference	2012	1
Men's basketball tournament	Metro Conference	1991	1
Men's basketball tournament	Florida Intercollegiate	1955	1
Men's basketball regular season	Dixie Conference	1951	1
Men's basketball regular season	Florida Intercollegiate	1955	1
Men's basketball regular season	Metro Conference	1978, 1989	2
Men's basketball regular season	Atlantic Coast Conference	2020	1
Women's basketball tournament	Metro Conference	1991	1
Women's basketball regular season	Atlantic Coast Conference	2009, 2010	2
Women's basketball regular season	Metro Conference	1991	1
Beach volleyball tournament	Coastal Collegiate Sports Association	2016, 2017, 2018, 2019, 2021, 2022, 2024	7
Beach volleyball tournament	Big 12 Conference	2026	1
Beach volleyball regular season	Coastal Collegiate Sports Association	2016, 2017, 2018, 2019, 2021, 2024	6
Beach volleyball regular season	Big 12 Conference	2026	1
Men's cross country	Atlantic Coast Conference	2010	1
Men's cross country	Metro Conference	1978, 1979, 1982	3
Women's cross country	Atlantic Coast Conference	2007, 2008, 2009, 2010, 2011, 2012, 2013	7
Football	Atlantic Coast Conference	1992, 1993, 1994, 1995, 1996, 1997, 1998, 1999, 2000, 2002, 2003, 2005, 2012, 2013, 2014, 2023	16
Football	Dixie Conference	1948, 1949, 1950	3
Men's golf	Atlantic Coast Conference	2008	1
Men's golf	Metro Conference	1977, 1978, 1979, 1980, 1981, 1982, 1983, 1984, 1985, 1986, 1987, 1989, 1990	13
Men's golf	Dixie Conference	1950	1
Women's golf	Atlantic Coast Conference	2025	1
Women's golf	Metro Conference	1988, 1989, 1991	3
Men's tennis	Atlantic Coast Conference	2024	1
Men's indoor track and field	Atlantic Coast Conference	1994, 2003, 2004, 2005, 2006, 2007, 2008. 2009, 2010, 2012, 2014, 2018, 2019, 2020, 2026	15
Women's indoor track and field	Atlantic Coast Conference	2009, 2014, 2018, 2021	4
Men's outdoor track and field	Atlantic Coast Conference	2002, 2003, 2005, 2006, 2007, 2008, 2009, 2010, 2011, 2013, 2014, 2015, 2018, 2021, 2022	15
Men's outdoor track and field	Metro Conference	1977, 1978, 1979, 1980, 1981, 1982, 1983, 1984, 1985, 1986, 1987, 1988, 1989, 1990, 1991	15
Men's outdoor track and field	Southeastern Independent	1972, 1973, 1974	3
Men's outdoor track and field	Dixie Conference	1950, 1951	2
Women's outdoor track and field	Atlantic Coast Conference	2000, 2009, 2014, 2016, 2019, 2021	6
Women's outdoor track and field	Metro Conference	1989, 1990, 1991	3
Women's soccer tournament	Atlantic Coast Conference	2011, 2013, 2014, 2015, 2016, 2018, 2020, 2021, 2022, 2023, 2024	11
Women's soccer regular season	Atlantic Coast Conference	2009, 2012, 2014, 2020, 2022, 2023	6
Softball tournament	Atlantic Coast Conference	1992, 1993, 1995, 1996, 1997, 1998, 1999, 2000, 2003, 2004, 2011, 2014, 2015, 2016, 2017, 2018, 2019, 2022, 2023, 2026	20
Softball regular season	Atlantic Coast Conference	1992, 1993, 1994, 1995, 1997, 1999, 2000, 2001, 2002, 2003, 2004, 2013, 2014, 2015, 2016, 2017, 2018, 2023, 2025, 2026	20
Men's swimming and diving	Atlantic Coast Conference	2007	1
Women's swimming and diving	Atlantic Coast Conference	2006	1
Women's swimming and diving	Metro Conference	1991	1
Men's tennis	Metro Conference	1981, 1983, 1984, 1985, 1988	5
Men's tennis	Dixie Conference	1949, 1950, 1951	3
Women's tennis	Metro Conference	1981, 1983, 1984, 1989, 1991	5
Volleyball	Atlantic Coast Conference	1998, 2009, 2011, 2012, 2023	5
Volleyball	Metro Conference	1983, 1985, 1986, 1987, 1988, 1989	6
Total Championships:			257

- Total Conference Championships (207)
  - Atlantic Coast Conference (114)
  - Big 12 Conference (1)
  - Metro Conference (68)
  - Dixie Conference (10)
  - Southeastern Independent (3)
  - Florida Intercollegiate Conference (3)
  - Coastal Collegiate Sports Association (7)

=== Division championships ===
Sport	Division	Championship years	Number of championships
Baseball	ACC Atlantic	2007, 2008, 2009, 2010, 2011, 2012, 2013, 2014	8
Football	ACC Atlantic	2005, 2008, 2010, 2012, 2013, 2014	6
Softball	ACC Atlantic	2018, 2019	2
Total Championships:			16

== Athletic facilities ==
Florida State University has invested and continues to invest largely in the athletic centers and facilities around campus. The most visible stadium is Bobby Bowden Field at Doak Campbell Stadium which is surrounded by the University Center, which houses the university administration, several colleges and departments.

Coyle E. Moore Athletics Center

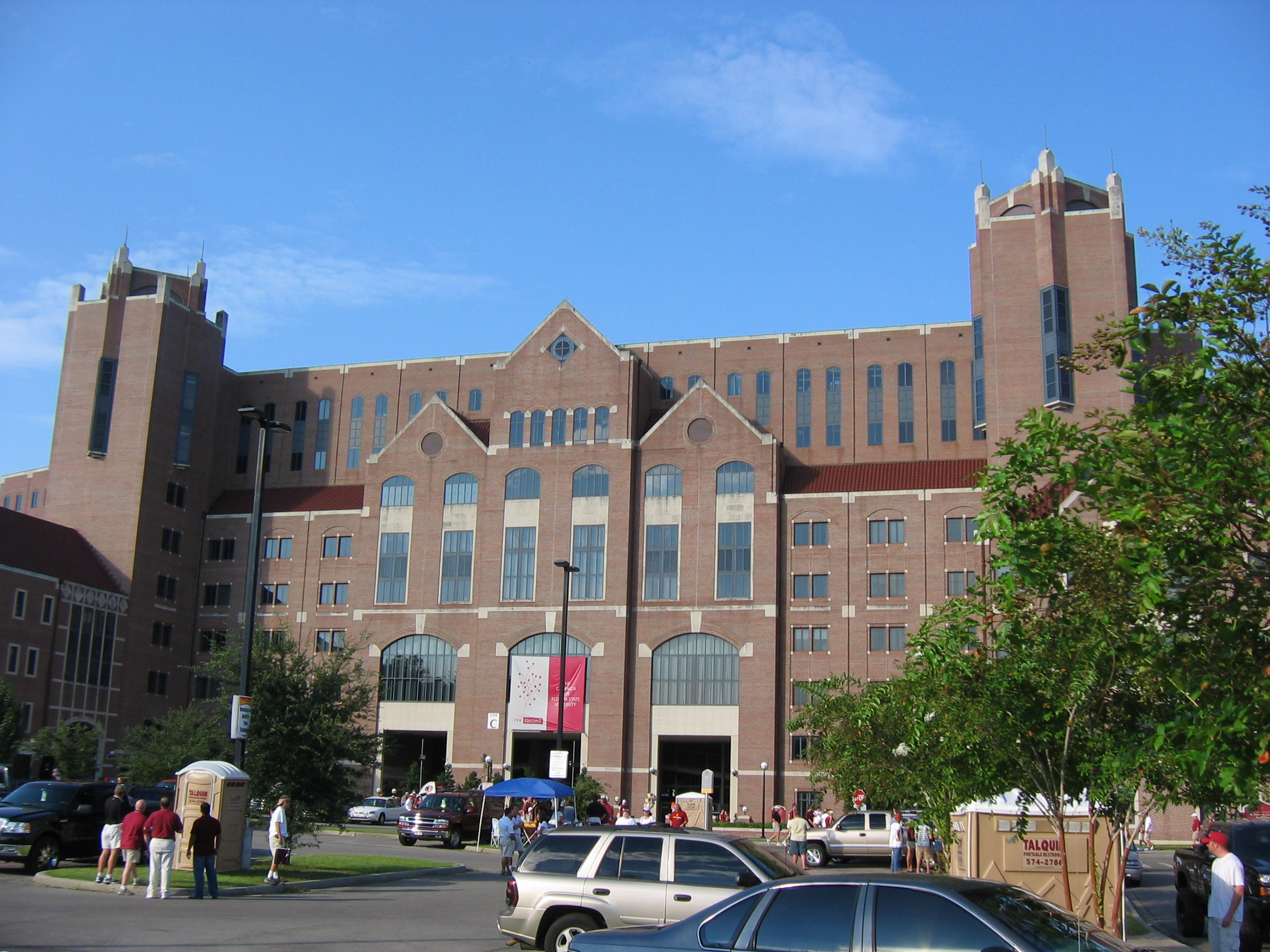
The Moore Center

The Coyle E. Moore Athletic Center is located on the north side of the University Center and is the center of Florida State Athletics and its 400-plus student-athletes. It is home to the Athletics Administration and support staff and houses the Executive Staff, Business Office, Computer Information Services, Coaches' Video, Seminole Productions, College of Communication faculty offices and student edit rooms, Academic Support, Student Services, Compliance, Sports Information, Digital Media, Marketing and Promotions, Facilities and Event Management, classrooms, a dining facility with a full service kitchen, and a mailroom. Initially built in the 1950s as a football field house, the original infrastructure of the athletic center plumbing, sewage, and air-conditioning had become inadequate to the demands placed upon it by far more student-athletes and staff than it was designed for. In 2004, the Moore Building underwent an overhaul makeover to match the appearance of the rest of the University Center with a more efficient floor plan to allow for more room for growth. The new facility includes a dining hall, a 15,000 square foot training and rehab facility, and a more than 8,000 square foot tutorial and study hall space. A multi-purpose theater for team meetings, press conferences, and symposiums is also located on the first floor of the Moore Athletic Center. In an effort to enhance the studies of Florida State students, there is also a designated space for athletic-training curriculum and a studio provided for the College of Communication students to gain hands on experience producing work for Seminole athletics.

Albert J. Dunlap Athletic Training Facility

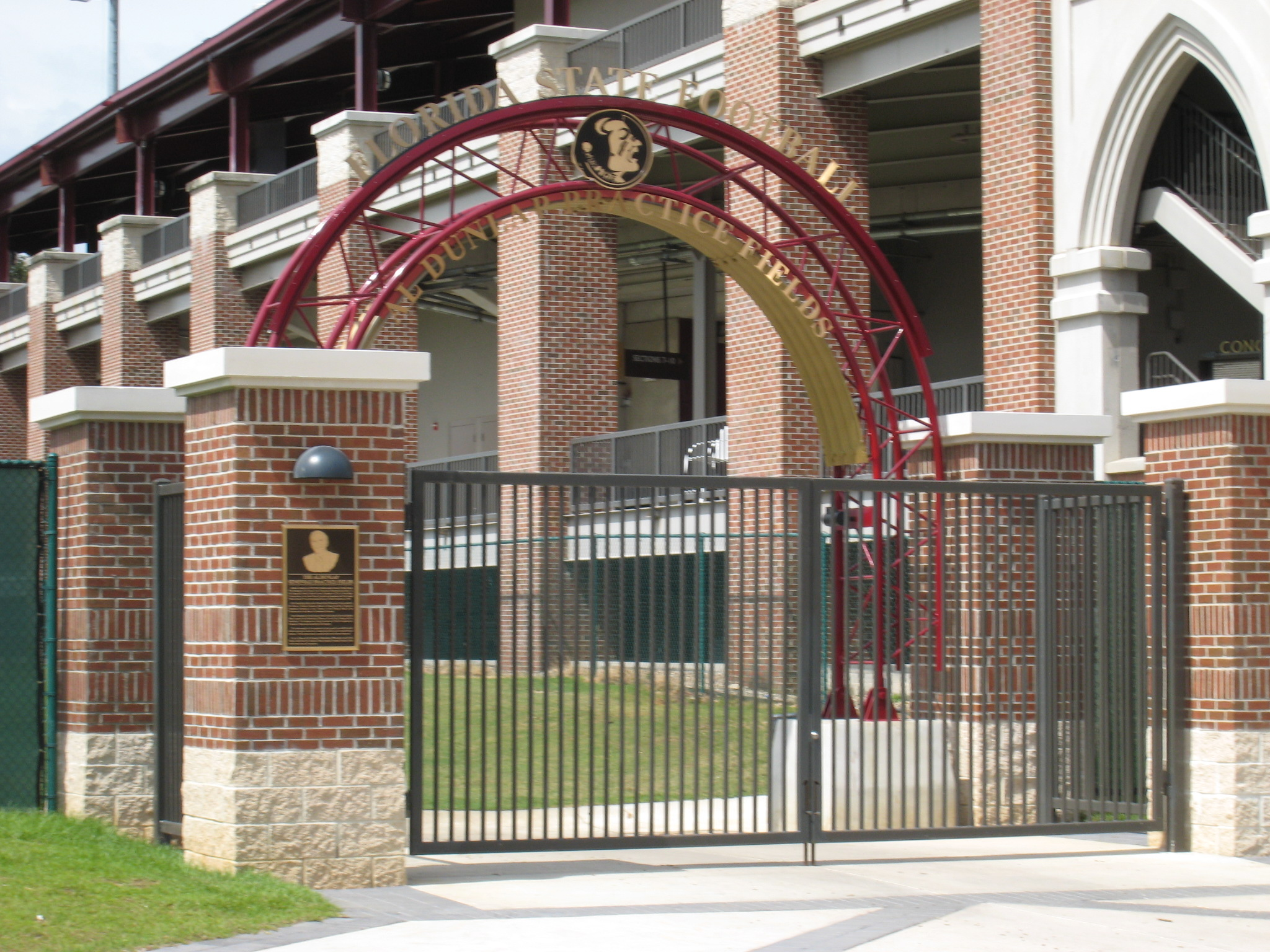
Florida State football practice fields

The Dunlap Indoor Practice Facility is the indoor field used by the football team. It is located adjacent to the stadium, next to the outdoor practice fields.

Bill Harkins Field at the Manley R. Whitcomb Band Complex

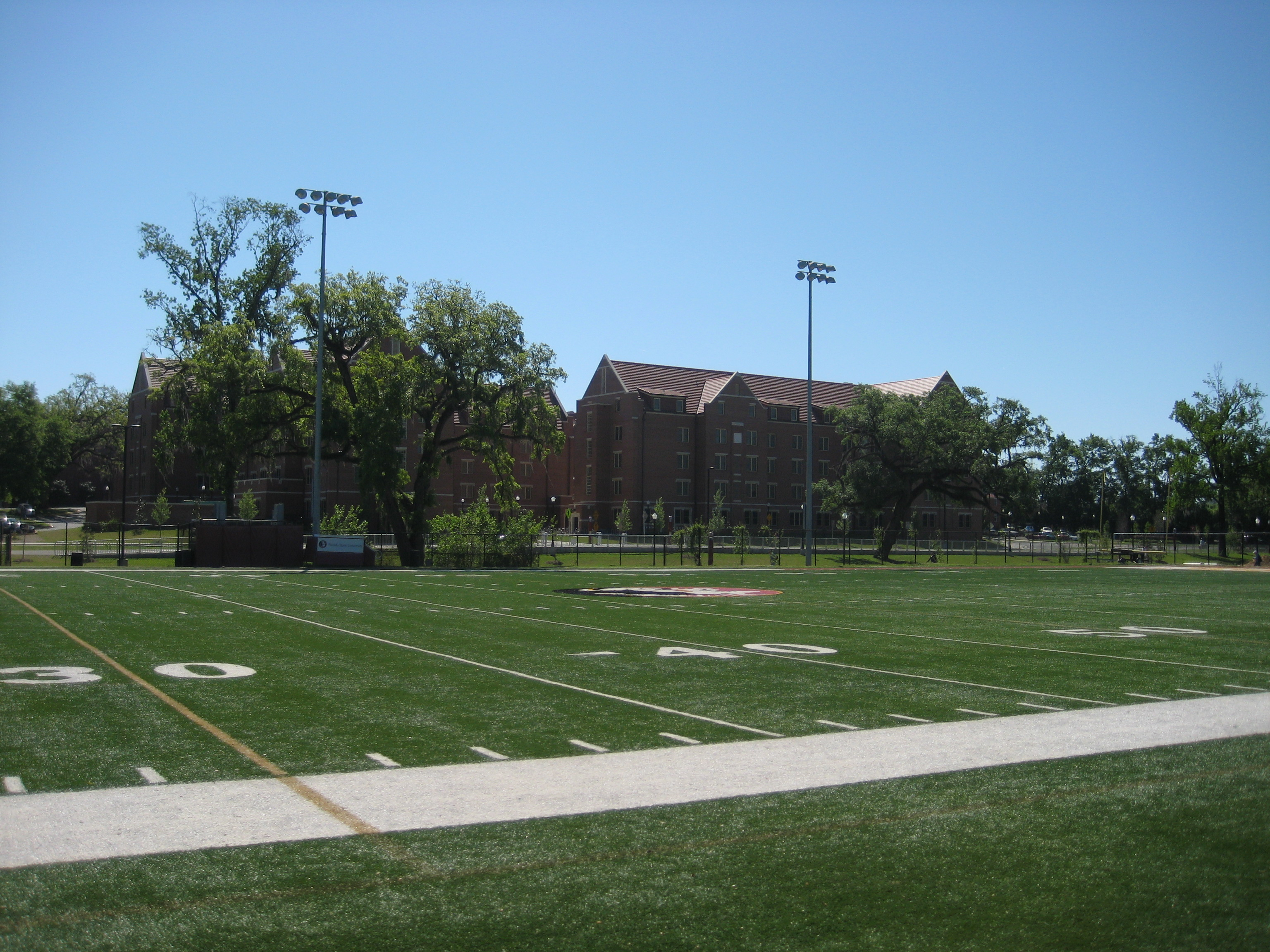
Bill Harkins Field

Bill Harkins Field at the Manley R. Whitcomb Band Complex is an artificial turf with rubber fill field built near the Flying High Circus on Chieftain Way. The field is an exact replica of what Bobby Bowden field looked like on game days at the time of the field's construction. Since then several alterations have been made to the field. Bill Harkins, head coach of the men's lacrosse team from 2004 to 2013, donated $350,000 towards the construction of the new field. Previously the space was a grassy field that often alternated between dusty and muddy. The Florida State University Marching Chiefs have primary use of the field and use it for their daily practices. The football team and lacrosse teams have secondary use of the field with the lacrosse team using the field for practices and games. The football team sometimes uses the practice field in anticipation of games at stadiums with artificial turf.

Bobby Bowden Field at Doak Campbell Stadium

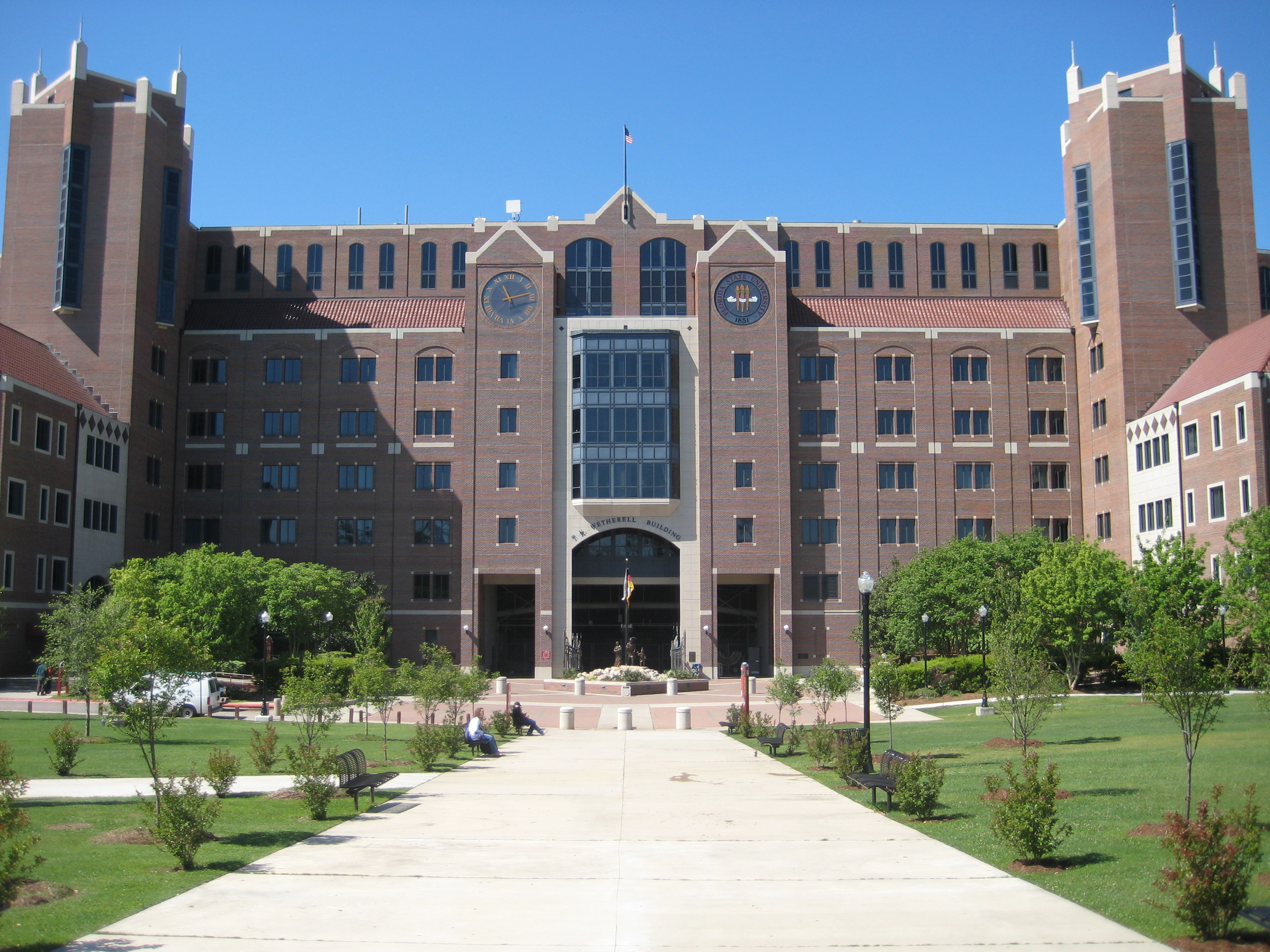
Doak Campbell Stadium

The stadium, named after FSU President Doak Campbell, hosted its first game against the Randolph-Macon College Yellowjackets on October 7, 1950, with the Seminoles winning the game 40–7. At that time the facility had a seating capacity of 15,000. Florida State began to play at Centennial Field during the team's 1947 season and would continue to play there for the following two years (1948 and 1949). Florida State College – FSU predecessor institution – also fielded teams from 1902 to 1904 (precise location of where games were played is not documented). Doak Campbell Stadium, with its original capacity of 15,000 in 1950, was built at a cost of $250,000. In 1954, the stadium grew to a capacity of 19,000. Six thousand more seats were added in 1961. During the Bill Peterson era (1960–70), the stadium was expanded to 40,500 seats, and it remained at that capacity for the next 14 years. Since that time, the stadium has expanded to 82,300, largely in part to the success of the football team under head coach Bobby Bowden coupled with the ever growing student body. It now is the second largest football stadium in the ACC. Aesthetically, a brick facade surrounding the stadium matches the architectural design of most of the buildings on the university's campus. In addition to sporting events, the University Center surrounds the stadium and houses many of the university's offices. The field was officially named Bobby Bowden field on November 20, 2004, as Florida State hosted intrastate rival Florida.

Donald L. Tucker Civic Center

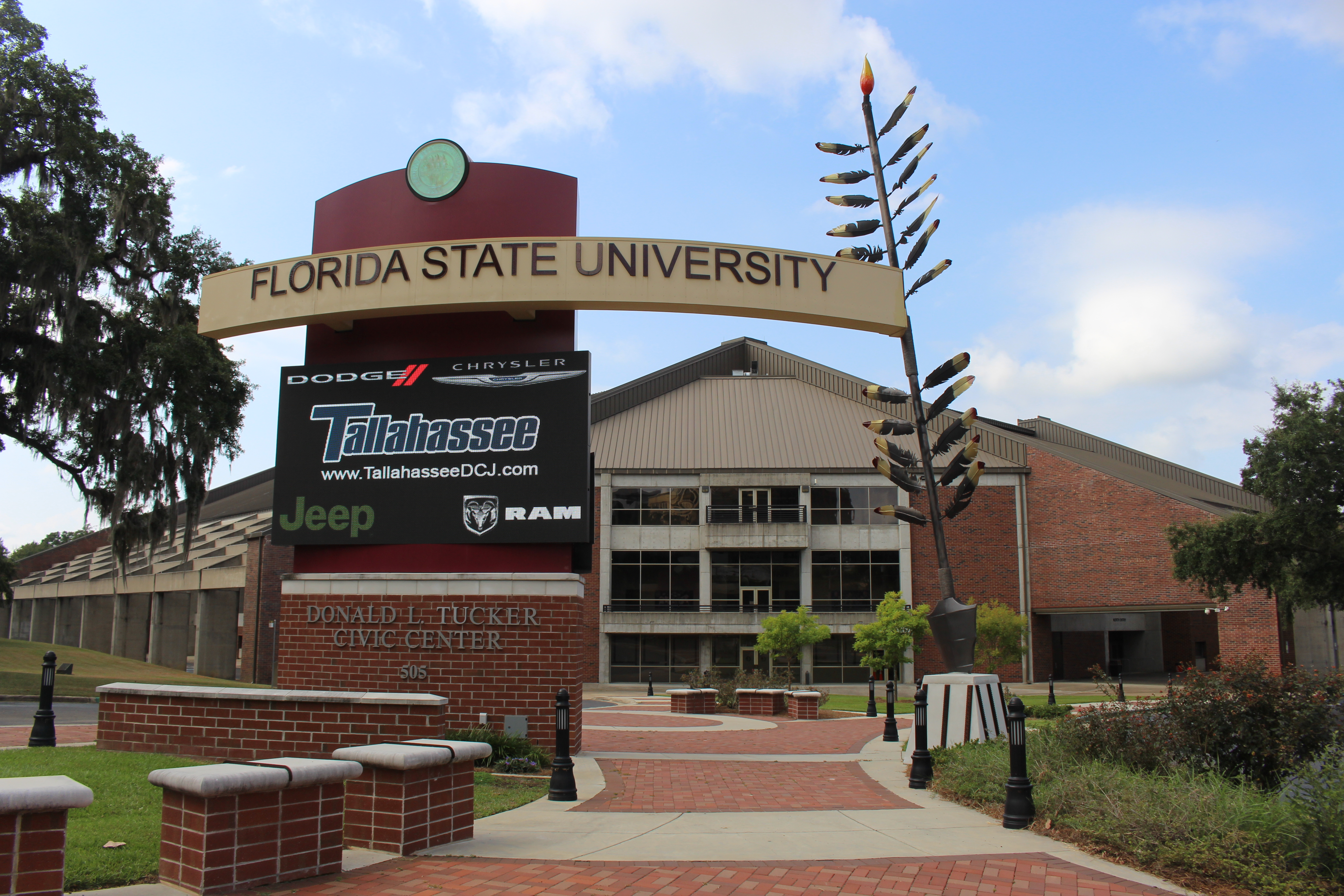
Donald L. Tucker Civic Center

The Donald L. Tucker Center is the home for Seminole basketball is named in honor of Donald L. Tucker, a former Speaker of the Florida House of Representatives and Special Ambassador for the United States to the Dominican Republic. Prior to the 2000–01 basketball season, the center completed an expansion project which began in October 1998 in which 34 luxury suites and 468 club seats at mid-level in the arena were added. In addition, the upper level seating was configured to offer better viewing and additional concession stands and restrooms were added. The Spotlight Grill, a 450-seat arena-view restaurant includes an outdoor patio and ledge seating for viewing arena events. The multi-purpose facility, which opened its doors in 1981, covers over 22 acres in the heart of Tallahassee's downtown district. The Civic Center is only two blocks from the Capitol building and is just across the street from FSU's nationally-acclaimed Law School and Center for Professional Development. The complex covers over 18,000 square feet with 119-foot ceilings in the main arena. The Tucker Center is actually three different areas combined under one roof. The main arena, where FSU hosts its home games. The Exhibition Hall, which joins the main arena via a hallway, can seat 5,000 for an event or serve as an indoor display area. The complex also features a terrace for outdoor hosting.

Seminole Basketball Training Center

The 40,000 square foot Florida State Basketball Training Center is attached to the Donald L. Tucker Center and is one of the nation's top basketball-only facilities. The $10 million facility opened in April 2002 is home to the Seminole men's and women's basketball programs. It provides a permanent home for the Seminoles to practice, hold meetings and watch film. The Seminoles have their own practice floor, locker rooms, coaches' offices, meeting and film rooms, an expansive player's lounge, a tradition room and offices for support staff.

Don Veller Seminole Golf Course

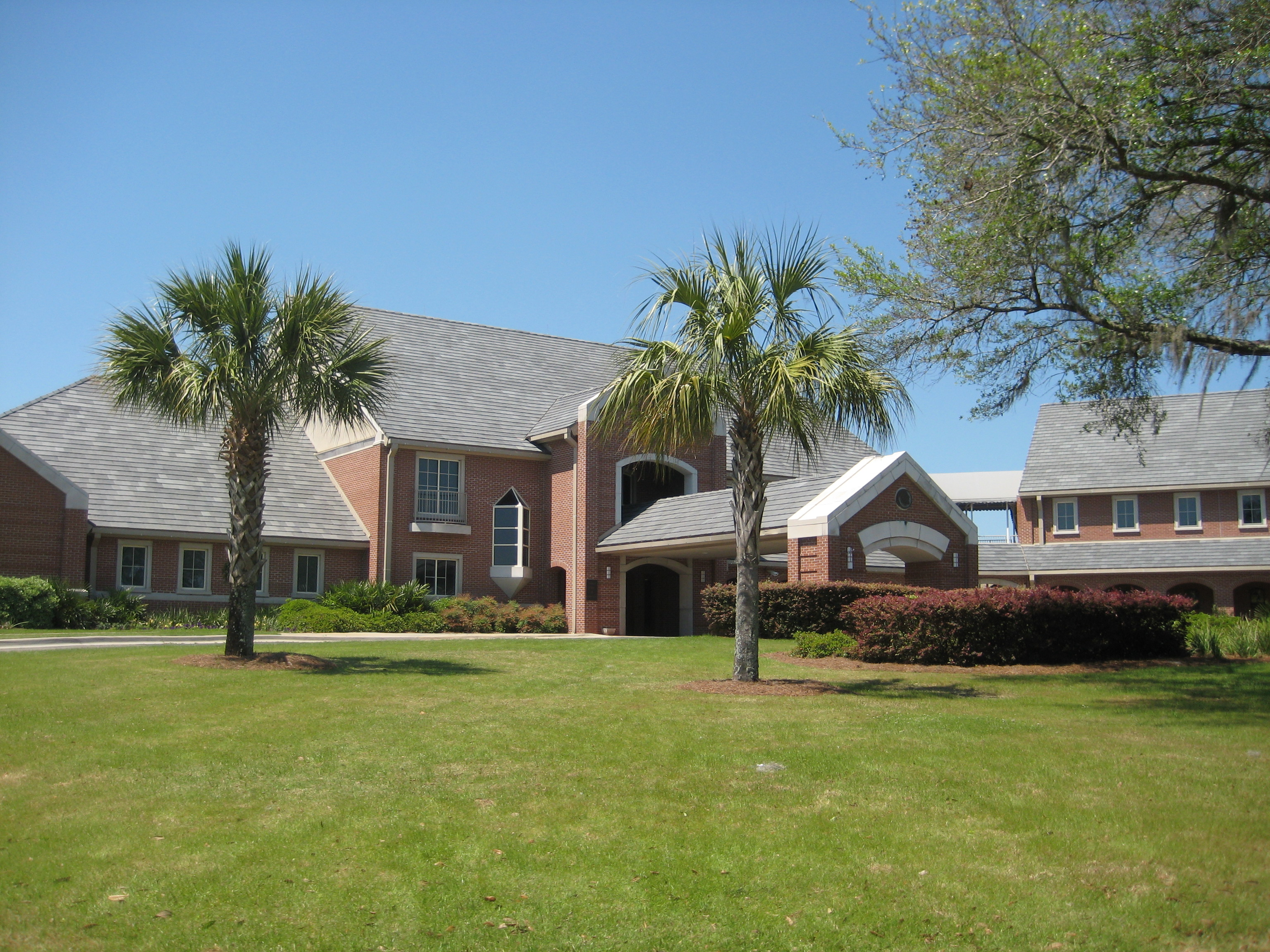
Don Veller Seminole Golf Course

The Don Veller Seminole Golf course was originally built in 1962, later redesigned in 2004 and is home to the Seminoles' practice greens, training center and the Dave Middleton Golf Center. The golf center houses the SGC clubhouse and is also the location of the team's private facilities. Florida State golfers have a team room, on course workout facility and state of the art training center. The team room / facility is utilized for team meetings, as a study area between classes and practices and as a lounge when the team is not on the course. The course is Par 72 of 6,940 yards with a 73.4 course rating.

JoAnne Graf Field at the Seminole Softball Complex

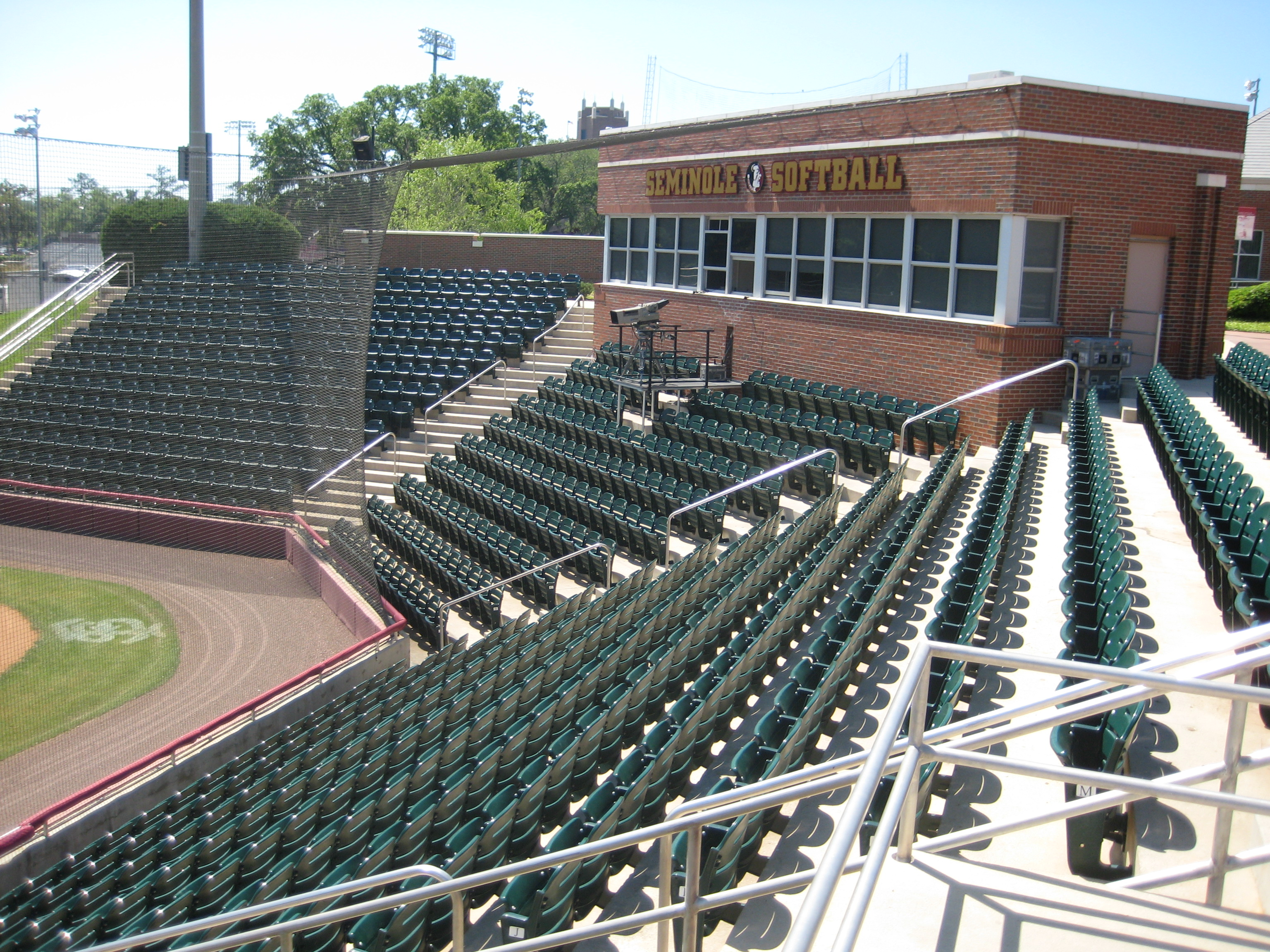
Seminole Softball Complex

The Florida State Soccer/Softball Complex was opened with a ribbon-cutting ceremony Saturday, April 17, 1999. The event, which was held in conjunction with Florida State's 30th Anniversary of Women's Intercollegiate Athletics Spring Celebration. JoAnne Graf Field hosted back-to-back NCAA Regionals in 2001 and 2002 and then again in 2004 and 2009. Known as one of NCAA softball's best venues, JoAnne Graf Field is a modernized field of play that caters quite well to student-athletes, coaches, fans and other spectators. Since opening in 1999, Florida State has played to the venue's home-field advantage. The Seminoles have recorded 384 victories in their 15 years at JoAnne Graf Field. Two major changes were made to the complex in the mid 2000s. On April 2, 2005, former university president Dr. T.K. Wetherell and former Athletics Director, Dave Hart, officially renamed the softball stadium "JoAnne Graf Field at the Seminole Softball Complex". She joined Bob Heck at Georgia State as the only two active softball coaches with fields named after them. In the fall of 2006, the stadium got a facelift as a Florida State unveiled a brand new video scoreboard for the 2007 season. The team building underwent a multi-million dollar renovation to the second floor which began in October 2008. The expansion to the second floor now includes new offices, a team meeting room, tradition space for both softball and soccer and a player lounge. In 2011 when a new indoor batting facility was constructed, approaching nearly 12,000 square feet. It is a two-story facility that includes a large bullpen, hitting nets and a wide area on the top floor for stretching and other softball activities. Another recent addition to the field was the installation of new wall padding in 2013.

Lucy McDaniel Volleyball Court at Tully Gymnasium

Tully Gymnasium has been home to Florida State volleyball for many years. The facility, which was constructed in 1956, was named for the late Robert Henry (Bobby) Tully, a 1952 FSU graduate and football player. Active on campus, Tully was a member of Gold Key, Omicron Delta Kappa, the Arnold Air Society and Alpha Tau Omega fraternity. He died in May 1954 after battling illness. With a capacity of 1,162, the gymnasium has undergone several renovations in recent years. Prior to the 2004 season, the playing floor was replaced with a new floor. New lighting was added before the 1999 season. Most recently in 2011, locker room renovations occurred to add to the facility's appeal. Tully Gymnasium also features new arena-style padded seating with armrests which were installed to create a more comfortable atmosphere for Seminole fans while watching Florida State volleyball. On November 2, 2000, in a special ceremony, Florida State dedicated the floor of Tully Gymnasium to Lucy McDaniel, the first woman in the state of Florida to donate more than one million dollars to a women's athletic program. The facility became known as the Lucy McDaniel Volleyball Court at Tully Gymnasium prior to the 2001 season, in honor of the gifts and support that McDaniel has provided to the Lady Seminole volleyball program and Florida State athletics.

Florida State University Beach Volleyball Courts

In 2012, Florida State started intercollegiate competition in beach volleyball, which the NCAA then called "sand volleyball". Beach volleyball courts were constructed adjacent to Mike Long Track and the soccer training fields.

Mcintosh Track and Field Building at Mike Long Track

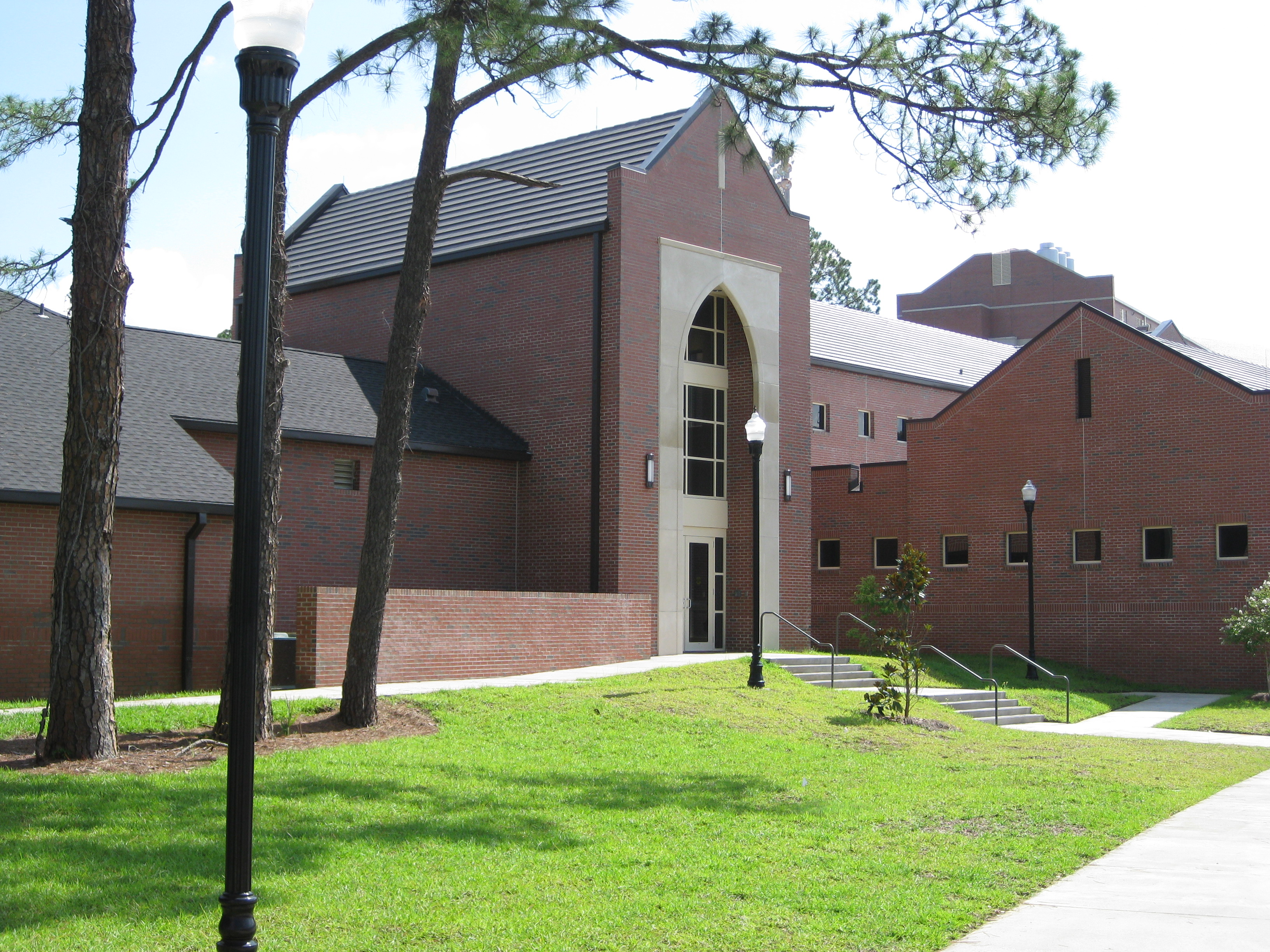
Mcintosh Track and Field Building at Mike Long Track

Named after Florida State's first track and field head coach, the complex has attracted some of the top meets in the nation. Mike Long Track and the City of Tallahassee played host to the USA Track and Field National Junior Championships in 1988 and the AAU National Championships in 1991. Florida State, with Mike Long Track, also hosted the Atlantic Coast Conference Outdoor Track and Field Championships in 1992 and 2005. The USA Track and Field National Junior Championships returned ti Mike Long Track in the Summer of '94. The British Olympic Team, who trained in Tallahassee for the 1996 Atlanta Summer Olympics, used the facility for all their track and field practices and workouts over the summer. The Florida State track and field team has been calling Mike Long Track home now for 53 years. The 2003 season marked the unveiling of Mike Long Track's brand new track, complete with a new surface, wider lanes, faster turns and a larger infield area for hosting field events. Seating capacity was also expanded to accommodate 1,500 spectators. The competition areas were resurfaced before the start of the 2008 season. In the spring of 2008 the newest addition to the facility, an 18,000-foot expansion gave the center a total space of 22,000 square feet. The improvements benefit not only the track and field/cross country programs, but also volleyball, soccer, softball and tennis student-athletes. The expanded center includes locker rooms, student-athlete lounges, medical preparation areas, coaches' offices and a conference room.

Mike Martin Field at Dick Howser Stadium

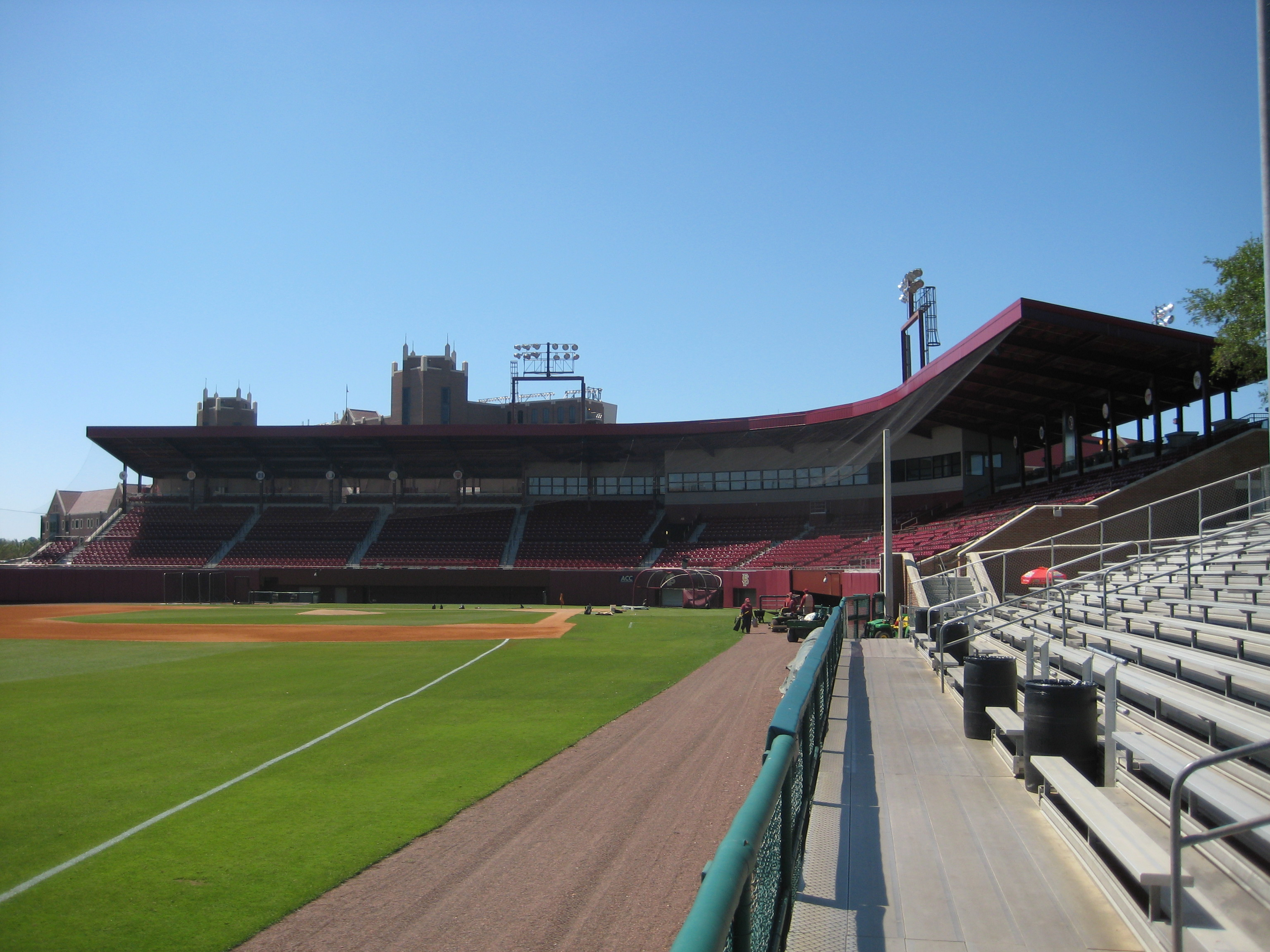
Mike Martin Field at Dick Howser Stadium

Located on the campus of Florida State University, Dick Howser Stadium is named after the late Kansas City Royals and Florida State manager who was also Florida State's first-ever baseball All-American. The stadium was dedicated in honor of Dick Howser in March 1988 prior to an exhibition game between Florida State and the Kansas City Royals, two of Howser's former teams. As part of the stadium dedication, Kansas City all-stars George Brett and Bo Jackson helped unveil a bronze bust of Howse in Haggard Baseball Plaza. A two-year, $12 million project was completed in 2004 and stadium capacity increased to 6,700. On April 2, 2005, Florida State University dedicated the field at Dick Howser to current head coach Mike Martin. Florida State's skipper for the last 30 years now coaches on the diamond bearing his name, Mike Martin Field at Dick Howser Stadium.

Morcom Aquatics Center

In 2008, Florida State opened the new $10.5 million Morcom Aquatic Center. The facility is located on the Southwest Campus next to the Don Veller Seminole Golf Course. The main pool features up to 30 practice lanes and maintains a temperature of 80 degrees. FSU swims in the same pool that hosted the 2005 FINA World Championships in Montreal, Canada. Locker rooms and coaches offices are located in the adjoined 10,000 square-foot building, which house the athletes equipment and coaching staff.

Scott Speicher Tennis Center at the Donald Loucks Courts

The Speicher Tennis Center was named in honor of Lieutenant Commander Michael Scott Speicher, a graduate of Florida State University. Speicher was considered the first American casualty during Operation Desert Storm, but was later reclassified by the United States government as missing in action in 2001 and missing or captured a year later. However, in 2009 Speicher's remains were found in the Anbar province of Iraq after a nearly 20-year search. The Scott Speicher family was later honored by Florida State at a home football game with a missing man formation flyover from the Navy. By Presidential directive, the facility bears the name the "Scott Speicher Tennis Center". In 1947, Loucks became Florida State's first basketball coach and a year later was named the school's first tennis coach. His tennis team was the first athletic team. The varsity tennis courts were named for Loucks in 1981. He served as Dean of men from 1957 to 1967 and was known as a servant of leadership, service and devotion to many worthy causes. With the first stage of construction completed in the summer of 1993, the Scott Speicher Tennis Center at the Donald Loucks Courts opened its gates to the public for the first time at a Children's Miracle Network charity tournament. Through its 18 year existence, the Scott Speicher Tennis Center at the Donald Loucks Courts has served as the home courts for all Florida State men's and women's home dual matches, the annual Seminole Fall Classics, City of Tallahassee tennis championships, various USTA regional and zonal tournaments, the 1994 and 1995 Men's Intercollegiate tournament and the annual Children's Miracle Network Charity Invitational benefiting Shands Hospital in Gainesville. The tennis center has also been the site for the ITA Summer Circuit for men's and women's tennis in which high school and collegiate athletes participate in singles and double matches.

Indoor tennis facility

Located on the Southwest Campus, the indoor tennis facility was completed in April 2011 adjacent to the aquatics center, Seminole golf course and the engineering buildings. The multi-million dollar Indoor practice facility serves as an additional playing arena for the Florida State tennis teams. Since the completion in spring of 2011, the facility has served as both a site for training and competition. The building hosts six regulation courts, locker rooms, athletic training room, equipment room, office and lobby. For the next phase, plans are in place to add spectator seating, team lounges, extended locker rooms, offices and a press box. Besides use from the tennis programs the Multi-Purpose Educational Facility is used for academic classes, clinics and camps. The facility is the only indoor tennis facility approved for college competition in the state of Florida and only one of a few in the southeast.

Seminole Soccer Complex

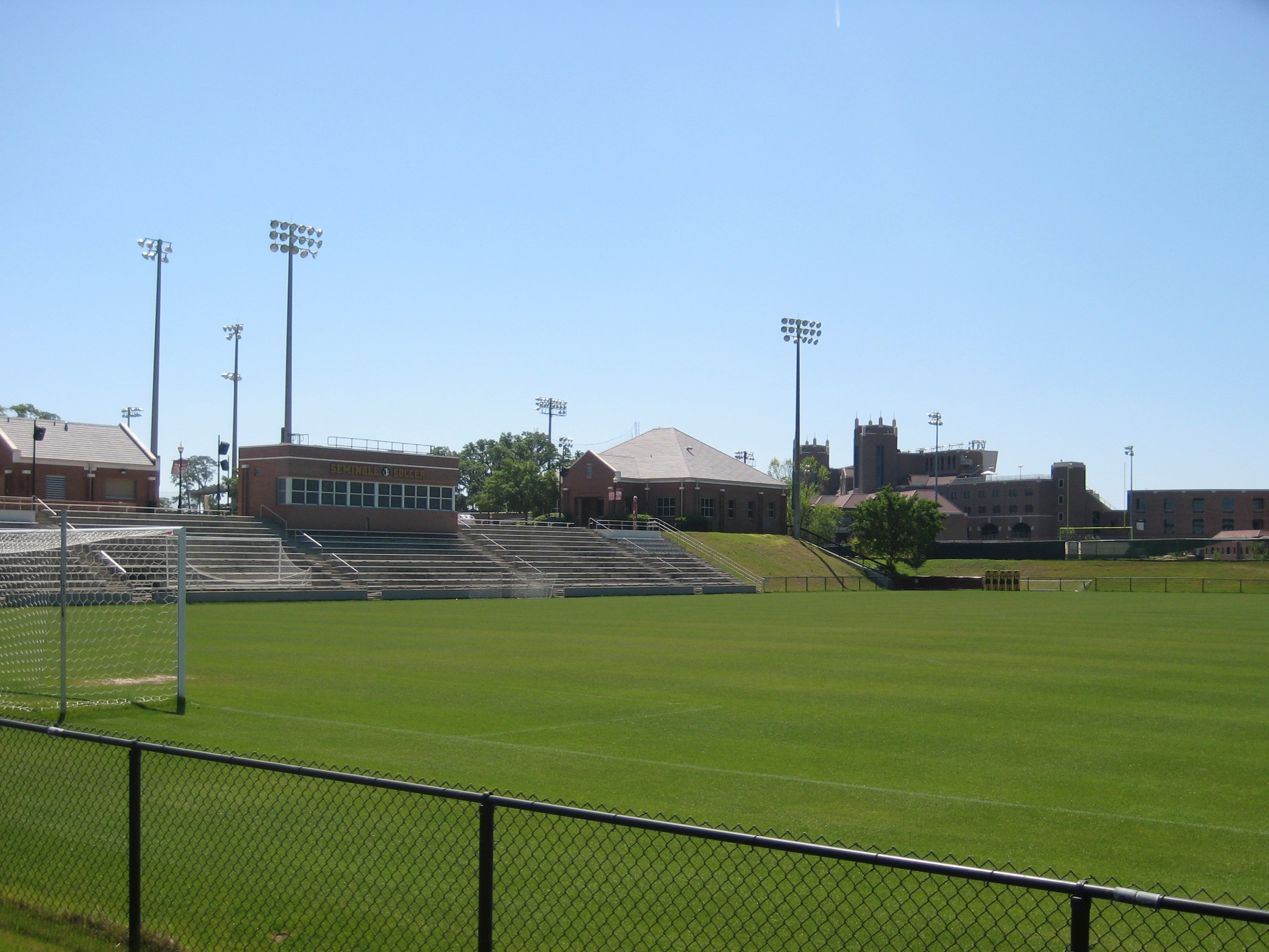
Seminole Soccer Complex

In the spring of 1998, Florida State's dream of a new complex started to become a reality, as ground was broken for the new facility and construction began. Although the new facility was not completed, the Seminoles began playing on their new field in the fall of 1998. The 1999 season marked the first full season in the new 1,600-seat Seminole Soccer Complex, which is regarded as one of the nation's best with its new top-playing surface. The two-level Mary Ann Stiles & Barry Smith Team Building houses the coaches' offices which overlook the soccer field, a reception area, a combined workroom, large team and coaches locker rooms, visiting team locker rooms and training and equipment rooms. The team building will undergo a multi-million dollar renovation to the second floor beginning in October 2008 with an expected completion date in June 2009. The expansion to the second floor will include new offices, a team meeting room, tradition space for both sports and a player lounge. Although the Seminole Soccer Complex is still one of the newest facilities on the Florida State campus, FSU's commitment to the success of the soccer program continues to show with the latest upgrade to the facility. Florida State unveiled a brand new video scoreboard in 2006. The Seminole Soccer Complex now has a capacity of 2,000.

Apalachee Regional Park

Apalachee Regional Park is the home course for the Florida State Seminoles men's and women's cross country teams.

== Notable alumni ==
A number of FSU alumni have found success in professional sports, with 123 active alumni competing in sports including basketball, football, baseball and golf.

=== FSU Hall of Fame ===
The first hall of fame class was inducted in 1977.

- For a list of inductees by sport, see footnote
- For a list of inductees by year of induction, see footnote
- For a list of inductees by alphabetical order, see footnote

=== Olympians ===
FSU alums have competed at the Olympic Games, winning seventeen medals: six golds, four silvers, and seven bronzes. Florida State has sent athletes to every edition of the summer games since the 1972 Summer Olympics, sending a school-record 26 Olympians in 2024.

Athlete	Team	Games
Katherine Rawls	United States	1932 Summer Olympics, 1936 Summer Olympics
Rafael A. Lecuona	Cuba	1948 Summer Olympics, 1952 Summer Olympics, 1956 Summer Olympics
Bill Roetzheim	United States	1948 Summer Olympics, 1952 Summer Olympics
Don Holder	United States	1952 Summer Olympics
Margaret Coomber	Great Britain	1972 Summer Olympics
Danny Smith	Bahamas	1972 Summer Olympics, 1976 Summer Olympics
Phil Boggs	United States	1976 Summer Olympics
Wendy Fuller	Canada	1980 Summer Olympics, 1988 Summer Olympics
Bradley Cooper	Bahamas	1984 Summer Olympics, 1988 Summer Olympics
Orvill Dwyer-Brown	Jamaica	1984 Summer Olympics
Brenda Cliette	United States	1984 Summer Olympics
Esmeralda Garcia	Brazil	1984 Summer Olympics, 1988 Summer Olympics
Randy Givens	United States	1984 Summer Olympics
Walter McCoy	United States	1984 Summer Olympics
Marita Payne	Canada	1984 Summer Olympics, 1988 Summer Olympics
Angela Wright-Scott	United States	1984 Summer Olympics
Arthur Blake	United States	1988 Summer Olympics, 1992 Summer Olympics
Michelle Finn-Burrell	United States	1992 Summer Olympics
Tom Reither	Chile	1992 Summer Olympics
Keam Ang	Malaysia	1996 Summer Olympics
Kim Batten	United States	1996 Summer Olympics, 2000 Summer Olympics
Rob Braknis	Canada	1996 Summer Olympics
Brandon Dedekind	South Africa	1996 Summer Olympics, 2000 Summer Olympics
Nelson Mora	Venezuela	1996 Summer Olympics
Julio Santos	Ecuador	1996 Summer Olympics, 2000 Summer Olympics, 2004 Summer Olympics
Samantha George	Canada	2000 Summer Olympics
Iain Harnden	Zimbabwe	2000 Summer Olympics
Jayson Jones	Belize	2000 Summer Olympics
Doug Mientkiewicz	United States	2000 Summer Olympics
Wickus Neinaber	Swaziland	2000 Summer Olympics, 2004 Summer Olympics
Stephen Parry	Great Britain	2000 Summer Olympics, 2004 Summer Olympics
Brett Peterson	South Africa	2000 Summer Olympics
Tal Stricker	Israel	2000 Summer Olympics
Brian Dzingai	Zimbabwe	2004 Summer Olympics, 2008 Summer Olympics
Golda Marcus	El Salvador	2004 Summer Olympics, 2008 Summer Olympics
Chris Vythoulkas	Bahamas	2004 Summer Olympics
Kimberly Walker	Trinidad & Tobago	2004 Summer Olympics
Yuruby Alicart	Venezuela	2008 Summer Olympics
Gonzalo Barroilhet	Chile	2008 Summer Olympics, 2012 Summer Olympics
Jonathan Borlée	Belgium	2008 Summer Olympics, 2012 Summer Olympics, 2016 Summer Olympics, 2020 Summer Olympics
Kevin Borlée	Belgium	2008 Summer Olympics, 2012 Summer Olympics, 2016 Summer Olympics, 2020 Summer Olympics, 2024 Summer Olympics
Ricardo Chambers	Jamaica	2008 Summer Olympics
Rafeeq Curry	United States	2008 Summer Olympics
Walter Dix	United States	2008 Summer Olympics
Tom Lancashire	Great Britain	2008 Summer Olympics
Andrew Lemoncello	Great Britain	2008 Summer Olympics
Ngoni Makusha	Zimbabwe	2008 Summer Olympics
Barbara Parker	Great Britain	2008 Summer Olympics, 2012 Summer Olympics
Kaleigh Rafter	Canada	2008 Summer Olympics
Ariel Rittenhouse	United States	2008 Summer Olympics
Dorian Scott	Jamaica	2008 Summer Olympics, 2012 Summer Olympics
Mateo de Angulo	Colombia	2012 Summer Olympics
Hannah England	Great Britain	2012 Summer Olympics
Kemar Hyman	Cayman Islands	2012 Summer Olympics, 2016 Summer Olympics
Lacy Janson	United States	2012 Summer Olympics
Maurice Mitchell	United States	2012 Summer Olympics
Ciaran O'Lionaird	Ireland	2012 Summer Olympics
Kimberly Williams	Jamaica	2012 Summer Olympics, 2016 Summer Olympics, 2020 Summer Olympics, 2024 Summer Olympics
Anne Zagre	Belgium	2012 Summer Olympics, 2016 Summer Olympics
Katrina Young	United States	2016 Summer Olympics, 2020 Summer Olympics
Alonzo Russell	Bahamas	2016 Summer Olympics, 2024 Summer Olympics
Stephen Newbold	Bahamas	2016 Summer Olympics
Shaquania Dorsett	Bahamas	2016 Summer Olympics
Stefan Brits	South Africa	2016 Summer Olympics
Kellion Knibb	Jamaica	2016 Summer Olympics
Violah Lagat	Kenya	2016 Summer Olympics
Marvin Bracy	United States	2016 Summer Olympics
Colleen Quigley	United States	2016 Summer Olympics
Pavel Sankovich	Belarus	2016 Summer Olympics
Nick Lucena	United States	2016 Summer Olympics
Linden Hall	Australia	2016 Summer Olympics, 2024 Summer Olympics
Susan Kuijken	Netherlands	2016 Summer Olympics
Leticia Romero	Spain	2016 Summer Olympics, 2024 Summer Olympics
Leonor Rodriguez	Spain	2016 Summer Olympics, 2020 Summer Olympics, 2024 Summer Olympics
Meme Jean	Haiti	2016 Summer Olympics
Gabby Carole	Canada	2020 Summer Olympics
Casey Krueger	United States	2020 Summer Olympics
Emir Muratovic	Bosnia and Herzegovina	2020 Summer Olympics
Ida Hulkko	Finland	2020 Summer Olympics, 2024 Summer Olympics
Julio Horrego	Honduras	2020 Summer Olympics, 2024 Summer Olympics
Izaak Bastian	Bahamas	2020 Summer Olympics
Maria Conde	Spain	2020 Summer Olympics, 2024 Summer Olympics
Peter Varjasi	Germany	2024 Summer Olympics
Cristobal Del Solar	United States	2024 Summer Olympics
Adriaan Wildschutt	South Africa	2024 Summer Olympics
Emma Terebo	France	2024 Summer Olympics
Max Wilson	U.S. Virgin Islands	2024 Summer Olympics
Jeremiah Davis	United States	2024 Summer Olympics
Julio Horrego	Honduras	2024 Summer Olympics
Casey Krueger	United States	2024 Summer Olympics
Jenna Nighswonger	United States	2024 Summer Olympics
Morgane Metraux	Switzerland	2024 Summer Olympics
Onyi Echegini	Nigeria	2024 Summer Olympics
Gloria Muzito	Uganda	2024 Summer Olympics
Max McCusker	Ireland	2024 Summer Olympics
Gabby Carle	Canada	2024 Summer Olympics
Gloria Muzito	Uganda	2024 Summer Olympics
Emily Sams	United States	2024 Summer Olympics
Andy Coscoran	Ireland	2024 Summer Olympics
Lauren Ryan	Australia	2024 Summer Olympics
Ieva Zarankaite	Lithuania	2024 Summer Olympics

== 2006–2010 NCAA penalties ==
The athletic department emerged in January 2010 from NCAA sanctions resulting from the discovery of academic cheating by athletes in 2006–2007. This discovery involved athletes in ten sports programs who were taking an online course in music history. An NCAA investigation resulted in scholarship limits and negation of wins involving compromised athletes. Florida State appealed parts of the decision. The penalties removed fourteen football wins from the career total of Seminoles football coach Bobby Bowden, yet the coach temporarily claimed the all-time record for Division 1 football wins in 2012 when a far larger number of victories was deducted from the career total of Pennsylvania State University football coach Joe Paterno. Paterno's wins were later reinstated, however, following an appeal from the Penn State Board of Trustees in January 2015, leaving Coach Bowden with the 2nd all-time winningest record in Division 1 football.

Additionally, FSU vacated 22 wins in men's basketball, an NCAA post season baseball victory, one national championship in men's track and field, an NCAA tournament victory in women's basketball, as well as other wins in these and several other men's and women's sports.
