= Manley Whitcomb =

Orchestral and marching band conductor

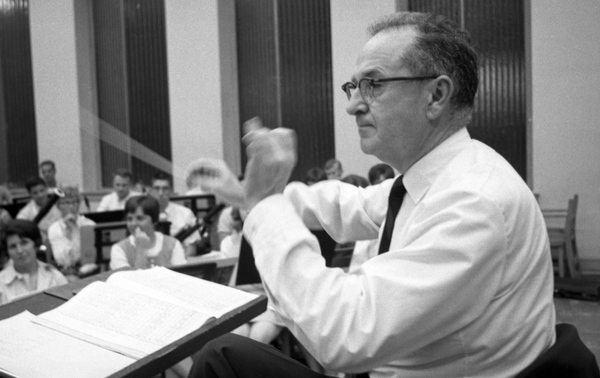
- Whitcomb in 1967 at FSU
- Born: January 21, 1913
- Died: November 20, 1987; Tallahassee, Florida
- Occupation: bandleader

Manley Rowley Whitcomb (January 21, 1913—November 20, 1987) was a concert band and marching band conductor known for being the director of Florida State University's Marching Chiefs. Whitcomb was Director of Bands at FSU from 1953 to 1970. Whitcomb has been cited as an influence for band composers such as Clare Grundman, who dedicated his American Folk Rhapsody No. 2 to him.

Whitcomb is credited with bringing "fast marching tempos [and] a high step with arm swing known as Chiefs Step" to FSU. This eight-to-five step—eight steps taken for every five yards—was said to have been invented by Whitcomb, and is now considered one of the standard marching step sizes. As the director of bands at FSU, he toured Europe and studied bandmasters and European music publishers. He became the coordinator of the FSU music education program in 1971.

== Ohio State University ==
Prior to arriving at FSU, Whitcomb was at Ohio State University in 1937. He became the conductor of both the Concert Band and the Marching Band in 1940 and served as the Director from 1939–43 and 1946–51, taking time off for military service during World War II. He traveled the state with the 90-piece Concert Band. He left OSU in 1953.

== Honors and awards ==
Whitcomb was the vice-president of the College Band Directors' National Association (CBDNA), and was the editor of the CBDNA forum in The Instrumentalist magazine. He was named the first Alumni Professor of the year at FSU in 1968, and was named as one of the ten most outstanding music directors in the US by School Musician magazine in 1972.

He was added to the Florida Bandmasters Association Roll of Distinction in 2006. The Manley R. Whitcomb Band Complex for the Florida State Seminoles and the Manley Whitcomb Scholarship are named in his honor.

== Personal life ==
Whitcomb was born in Mellen, Wisconsin and raised in Milwaukee. He graduated from Northwestern University with a degree in music education and was elected president of the University Band. He subsequently received a Masters of Music Degree from Northwestern and a PhD from Columbia University. Whitcomb married Leah Friedman on June 17, 1935, they had one son.
