= Florida State University College of Nursing =

College of Nursing
- Type: Nursing school
- Established: 1950
- Parent institution: Florida State University
- Dean: Jing Wang
- Students: 553
- Location: Tallahassee, Florida, U.S. 30°26′36.9″N 84°18′0.9″W
- Website: www.nursing.fsu.edu

The Florida State University College of Nursing, is the nursing school of the Florida State University. About 553 students are enrolled in classes, including undergraduates and graduate students. All programs are accredited by the Commission on Collegiate Nursing Education.

== History ==
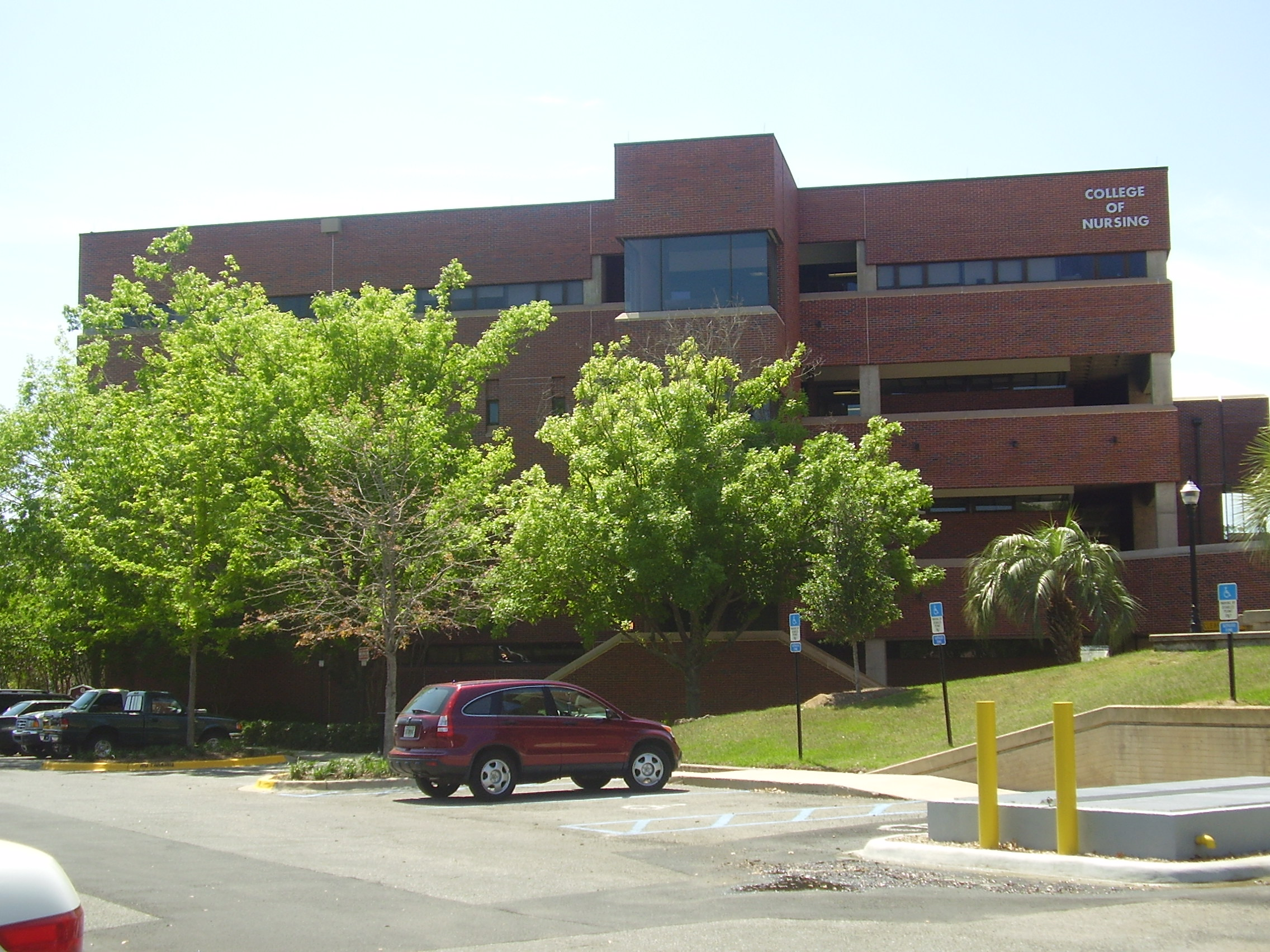
College of Nursing

=== College of Nursing today ===
A demanding program, incoming freshmen nursing students present a GPA of 3.5 or higher. Upper division students admitted to the college present a GPA average of 3.78. The College of Nursing has been approved by the Florida Board of Nursing since 1950. It has been accredited by the National League for Nursing since the first class graduated in 1952. The program is accredited by the Commission on Collegiate Nursing Education (CCNE). Approximately 120 undergraduate students are admitted to the BSN program at the college in the fall.

Florida State's Nursing graduates have a 97.8% passage rate on the state Nursing certification examination. One hundred percent of the College of Nursing's Advanced Nurse Practitioner master's degree graduates earn national specialty certification.

== National rankings ==
U.S. News & World Report (2016 edition)

- Nursing Schools: Doctor of Nursing Practice - 110th
- Nursing Schools: Master's - 133rd
- Online Graduate Nursing - 54th overall
- Online Master of Science - 10th overall
