= Florida State University College of Fine Arts =

Arts school of Florida State University

College of Fine Arts
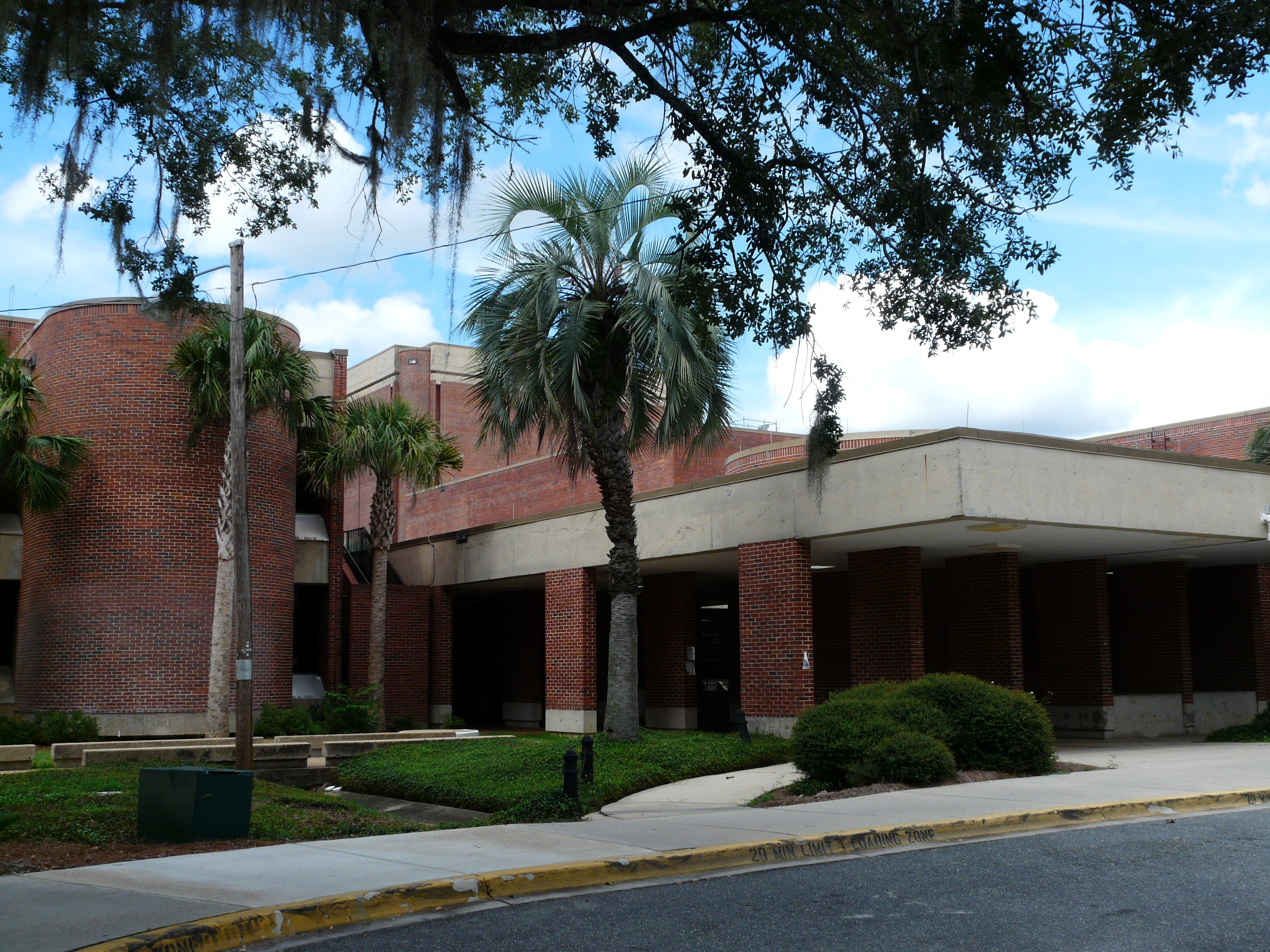
- Former names: College of Visual Arts, Theatre, and Dance
- Type: School of Art & Design, School of Theatre, School of Dance
- Established: 1943
- Affiliations: Florida State University
- Dean: James Frazier
- Students: 1,342
- Location: Tallahassee, Florida, U.S. 30°26′38.7″N 84°17′24.5″W
- Website: www.cfa.fsu.edu

The Florida State University College of Fine Arts, located in Tallahassee, Florida, is one of sixteen colleges comprising the Florida State University (FSU).

== National rankings ==
U.S. News & World Report (2015 edition)

- Fine Arts - 72nd overall

U.S. News & World Report (2016 edition)

- Fine Arts - 69th overall

"U.S. News & World Report" (2021 edition)

- Fine Arts - No. 21 among national public universities in the Best Graduate Fine Arts Programs category, and No. 42 overall

== Departments, schools, and programs ==
The College of Fine Arts includes six programs and four additional Fine Arts facilities on Florida State's main Tallahassee campus:

- Department of Art
- Department of Art Education
- Department of Art History
- School of Dance
- Department of Interior Architecture + Design
- School of Theatre
- Museum of Fine Arts
- Facility for Arts Research
- Maggie Allesee National Center for Choreography (MANCC)
- FSU/Asolo Conservatory for Actor Training

In 2015, the College changed its name to the Florida State University College of Fine Arts from the Florida State University College of Visual Arts, Theatre And Dance.[2]The college underwent a lengthy process to change the name, including meetings with faculty, chairs and directors, as well as votes from the faculty, council of deans, FSU Faculty and the Board of Trustees.

In 2016, the Department of Art was ranked the top Master of Fine Arts program in the state of Florida by U.S. News & World Report.

The Facilities for Arts Research (FAR) experiments with technology such as 3D printing and creating artists books with the Small Craft Advisory Press.

The Department of Art History was the first program in the state to offer a doctoral degree in the field of art history.

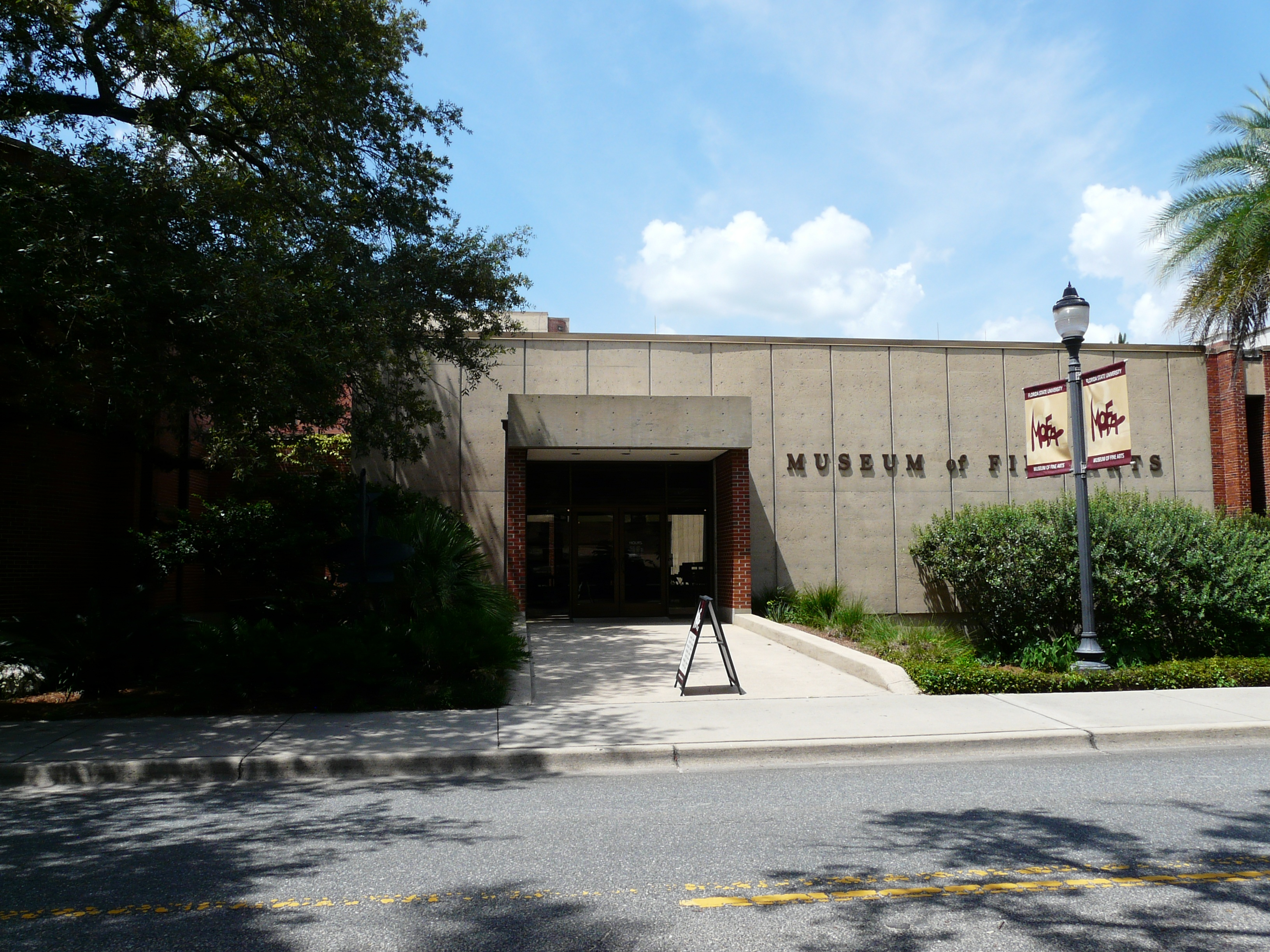
FSU Museum of Fine Arts

Along with the four art and design departments, Florida State University's College of Fine Arts also governs The John and Mable Ringling Museum of Art in Sarasota, Florida, and The Museum of Fine Arts (MoFA), which is housed on FSU's main campus. The Ringling Museum houses an extensive collection of Asian art, theatre artifacts, European and American art, and modern art. Students from the art history and art education departments have the opportunity to study at The Ringling Museum. The Museum of Fine Arts hosts exhibitions from students and artists in the local community as well as individuals. The MoFA is also home to a permanent collection of over 6,000 donated works which include African sculpture, modern American paintings, Japanese ukiyo-e prints, and a wealth of other pieces.

The Asolo Conservatory for Actor Training, the college's MFA Acting program, is in a separate campus in Sarasota.

The School of Dance is home to the dance research center, the Maggie Allesee National Center for Choreography (MANCC).

In 2022, it was the first year that MFA students curated a show in the WJB Gallery. The students focused on a collaboration called "Between the Lines" that explored how the artists conversed with the written language. The exhibit will be on view from December 2022 until January 10, 2023.

=== FSU/Asolo Conservatory for Actor Training ===
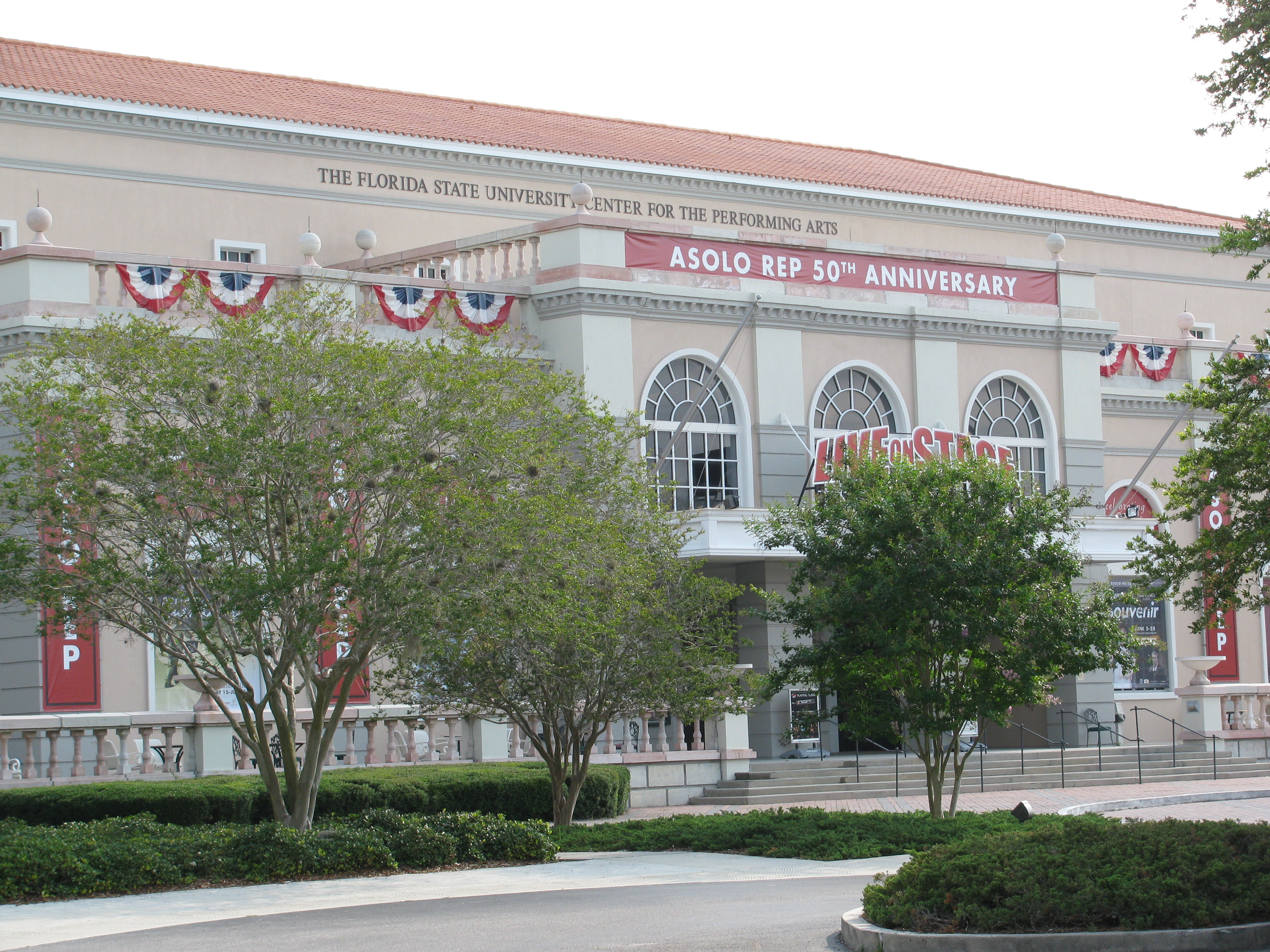
FSU Center for the Performing Arts in Sarasota, Florida

The FSU/Asolo Conservatory for Actor Training graduate program was relocated to Sarasota in 1973, and is now housed in the Florida State University Center for the Performing Arts.
