= Valentine Mason Johnson =

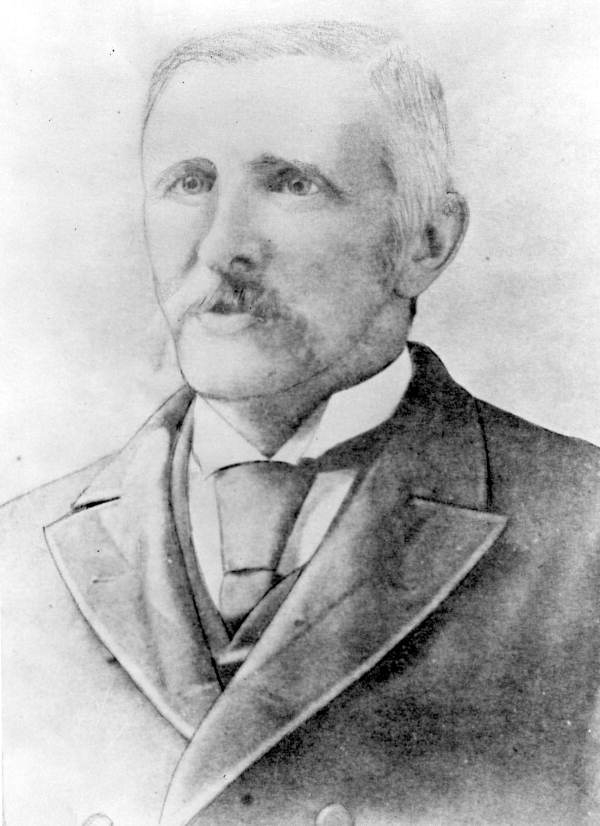
Valentine Mason Johnson

Valentine Mason Johnson (July 17, 1838 – October 19, 1909) was a professor of mathematics and the Superintendent of the West Florida Seminary during the American Civil War. Johnson was born in Spotsylvania County, Virginia and was an 1860 graduate of the Virginia Military Institute. Johnson died in Mountville, Virginia.

Johnson trained students at the West Florida Seminary who fought in the Battle of Natural Bridge and defeated Union forces attempting to capture Tallahassee, Florida. As a result of the battle, Tallahassee was the only Confederate capital east of the Mississippi River that did not fall to Union forces.

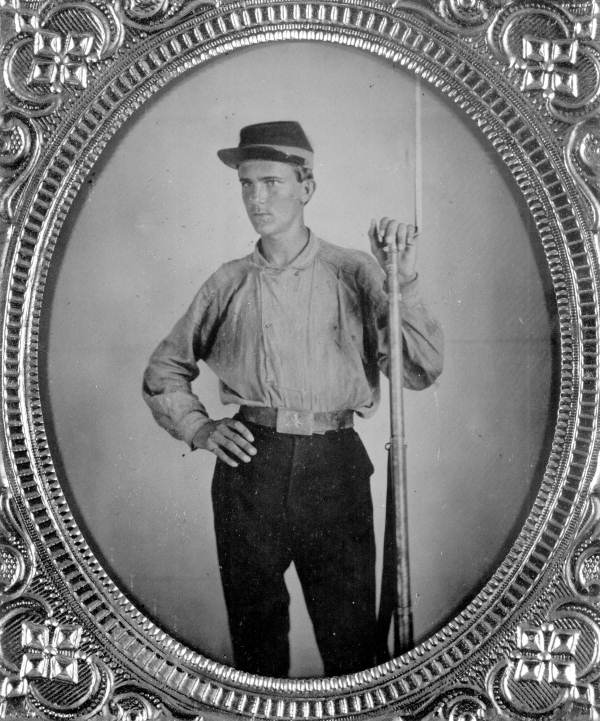
William Denham, West Florida Seminary student during the Civil War
