= Florida State University =

Public university in Tallahassee, Florida, US

- Former names: Florida Institute (1854–1857); Tallahassee Female Academy (1843–1858); West Florida Seminary (1857–1860; 1865–1901); The Florida Military and Collegiate Institute (1860–1865); The Literary College of the University of Florida (1883–1885); University of Florida (1885–1903); Florida State College (1901–1905); Florida Female College (1905); Florida State College for Women (1905–1947)
- Motto: Vires, Artes, Mores (Latin)
- Motto in English: "Strength, Skill, Character"
- Type: Public research university
- Established: January 24, 1851; 175 years ago (Note: Florida State University shows its charter date of 1851, the year the Florida legislature voted to establish two seminaries of learning: West Florida Seminary (which became the modern-day Florida State University) and East Florida Seminary (which became the modern-day University of Florida). The West Florida Seminary used the charter date before 1905, when the Buckman Act reorganized higher education in Florida and the three resulting state institutions adopted 1905 as their founding date. In 1935 the Florida Board of Control changed the founding dates of the University of Florida and the Florida State College for Women (now Florida State University) to the years their predecessor Seminaries opened as state-sponsored institutions, and Florida State's founding date was changed to 1857. In 2000, the Florida State University reverted to the charter date of 1851.)
- Parent institution: State University System of Florida
- Accreditation: SACS
- Academic affiliations: ORAU; URA; Sea-grant; Space-grant
- Endowment: $1.11 billion (2025)
- Budget: $3 billion (2024)
- President: Richard D. McCullough
- Provost: James J. Clark
- Faculty: 2,760 (2024)
- Administrative staff: 3,944 (2024)
- Students: 44,308 (fall 2024)
- Undergraduates: 32,356 (fall 2024)
- Postgraduates: 11,952 (fall 2024)
- Location: Tallahassee, Florida, United States; 30.442°N 84.298°W
- Campus: 487.5 acres (1.973 km^{2}) (Main Campus) Total, 1,715.5 acres (6.942 km^{2}); Midsize city
- Other campuses: Panama City, Florida; College of Medicine: Daytona Beach; Fort Pierce; Orlando; Pensacola; Sarasota; International study: London; Florence; Panama City, Panama; Valencia
- Newspaper: The Capital Collegian; FSView & Florida Flambeau
- Colors: Garnet and gold
- Nicknames: Seminoles; Noles
- Sporting affiliations: NCAA Division I FBS – ACC
- Mascots: Osceola and Renegade; Cimarron
- Website: fsu.edu

Florida State University (FSU or Florida State) is a public research university in Tallahassee, Florida, United States. It is a senior member of the State University System of Florida and a preeminent university in the state. Chartered in 1851, it is located on Florida's oldest continuous site of higher education.

Florida State University maintains 17 colleges, as well as 58 centers, facilities, labs, institutes, and professional training programs. In fall 2025, the university enrolled 46,184 students from all 50 states and 133 non-US countries. Florida State is home to Florida's only national laboratory, the National High Magnetic Field Laboratory, and was instrumental in the commercial development of the anti-cancer drug Taxol. Florida State University also operates the John & Mable Ringling Museum of Art, the State Art Museum of Florida and one of the nation's largest museum/university complexes. The university is accredited by the Southern Association of Colleges and Schools (SACSCOC).

The university is classified among "R1: Doctoral Universities – Very high research spending and doctorate production". Per 2023 National Science Foundation data the university had research and development (R&D) expenditures of $414.46 million and ranked 79th out of 890 evaluated institutions. The university has an annual budget of $3 billion and an annual estimated economic impact of $15.5 billion.

Florida State has a collaborative relationship with the Seminole Tribe of Florida and is allowed to use the name Seminoles and certain imagery. FSU's intercollegiate sports teams, known by their "Florida State Seminoles" nickname, compete in National Collegiate Athletic Association (NCAA) Division I and the Atlantic Coast Conference (ACC). Florida State's varsity teams have won 19 all-time national athletic championships in nine sports.

== History ==
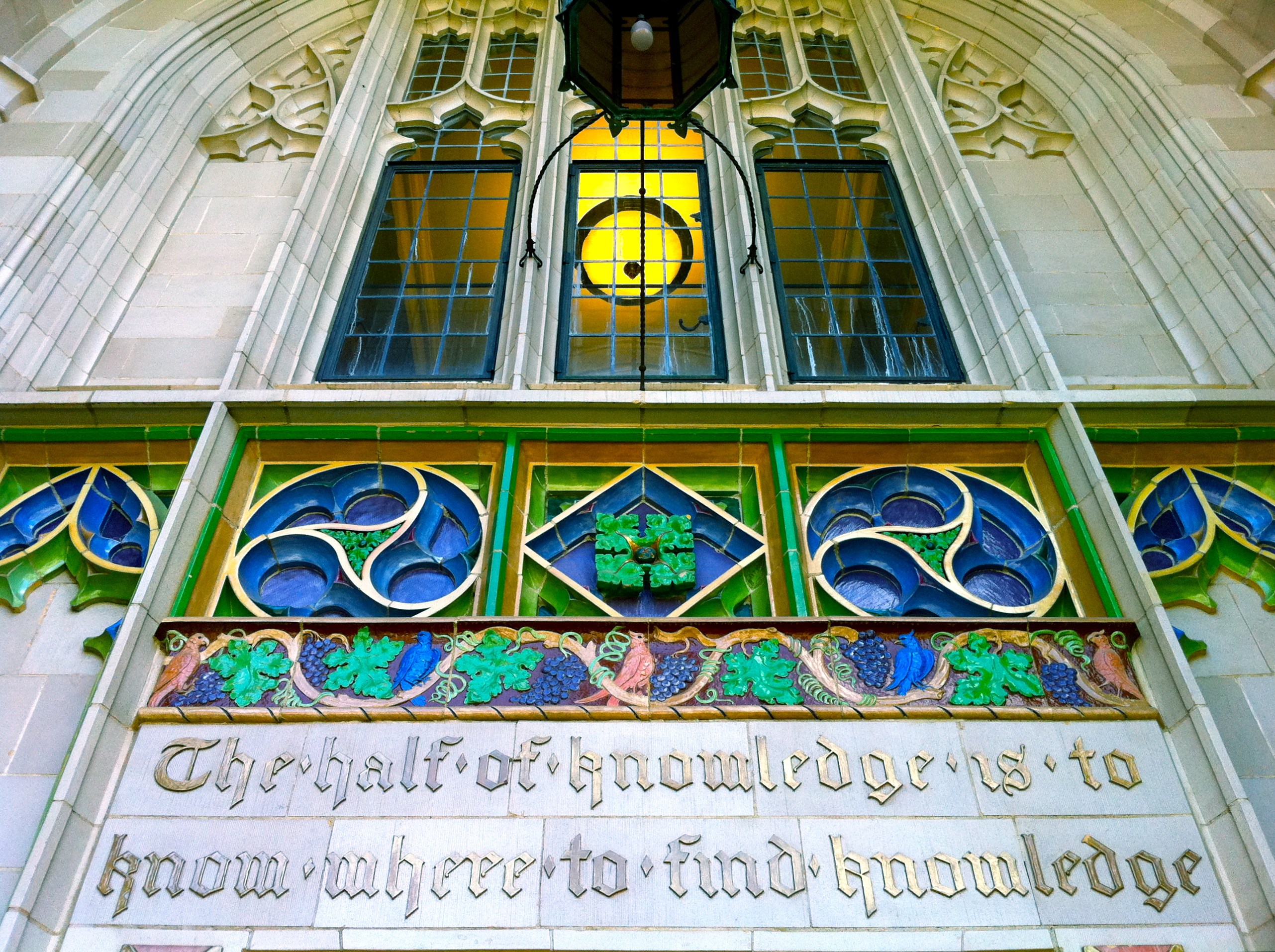
The facade of the main entrance to Dodd Hall. Built in 1925, Dodd Hall was the location of the Florida State Library until 1956. Rendered in gold leaf is the phrase, "The half of knowledge is to know where to find knowledge."

Florida State University is traceable to a plan set by the 1823 U.S. Congress to create a higher education system. The 1838 Florida Constitution codified the primary system by providing for land allocated for the schools. In 1845 Congress passed the law admitting Florida as the 27th state. In a supplementary act to the law granting admission, Congress authorized two townships to host seminaries, one east and one west of the Suwannee River.

In 1851, the Florida Legislature authorized the seminaries to be awarded to the two towns offering the best school support. The legislature declared the first purpose of these institutions was to train male and female teachers in all subjects generally taught at public schools, then to educate the public in agriculture, science, law and citizenship.

While the East Seminary was settled in Ocala in 1853, the West Seminary state institution opportunity created a contentious fight between the towns of Quincy, Marianna, and Tallahassee. Quincy dropped out of the competition in the following years, while Marianna and Tallahassee refused to yield. Failing to resolve the impasse, the conflict was returned to the governor and legislature for resolution. In 1854, as an incentive to the state, Tallahassee re-established an old school for boys, now called the Florida Institute, and combined the school with land and buildings. The legislature finally awarded Tallahassee with the West Seminary in 1856. The governor signed the law on January 1, 1857. In October 1858 the school was made coeducational by incorporating the Female Institute, which was located nearby.

The West Florida Seminary was located on the former Florida Institute property. The area, slightly west of the state Capitol, was formerly and ominously known as Gallows Hill, a place for public executions in early Tallahassee.

=== Civil War and Reconstruction ===
During 1860–1861, the legislature amended the 1851 law and started military instruction for students, partly due to the desire to protect the instructional staff from conscription, which would have closed the school. During the Civil War, the seminary became "'The Florida Military and Collegiate Institute.'" Enrollment grew to around 250 students. The school arguably became the state's largest and most respected educational institution. In 1865, at the Battle of Natural Bridge south of Tallahassee, cadets from the school joined active-duty Confederate troops in the defensive line.

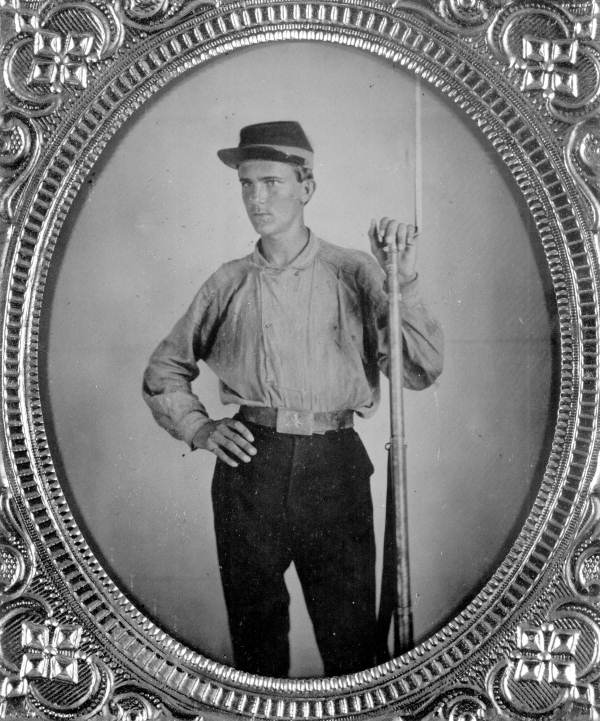
Cadet William Denham, circa 1860.

The cadets were trained by Valentine Mason Johnson and led into battle by Captain D.W. Gwynn. Some reports show the cadets played a minor role in the battle defending artillery pieces. The combined Confederate forces defeated attacking Union forces leaving Tallahassee as the only Confederate capital east of the Mississippi River not to fall to Union forces.

At the surrender of Florida, Union military forces disarmed the cadets and used campus buildings as barracks until September 1865. The school then reopened and resumed its academic purpose. The FSU Army Reserve Officers' Training Corps (ROTC) is authorized to display a battle streamer Natural Bridge 1865. FSU is one of four institutions that can display a military battle streamer.

=== First state university ===
Chemistry lab in 1900, at what was then known as the West Florida Seminary

In 1883, the institution officially known as the West Florida Seminary was organized by the Board of Education as the Literary College of the University of Florida. (In the terminology of the time, schools were divided into seminaries and literary institutions; the name does not imply a focus on literature.) Under the new university charter, the seminary became the institution's Literary College and was to contain several "schools" or departments in different disciplines. However, in the new university association the seminary's "separate Charter and special organization" were maintained. Florida University also incorporated the Tallahassee College of Medicine and Surgery, and recognized three more colleges to be established at a later date. The Florida Legislature recognized the university under the title " University of Florida" in Spring 1885 but committed no additional financing or support. Without legislative support, the university project struggled. The institution never assumed the "university" title, and the association dissolved when the medical college relocated to Jacksonville later that year.

According to Doak Campbell, Florida State University's fifth president, "During the first 50 years...its activities were limited to courses of secondary-school grade. Progress was slow. Indeed, it was not until the turn of the [twentieth] century that it could properly qualify as a collegiate institution." In 1901, it became Florida State College.

=== Buckman Act ===
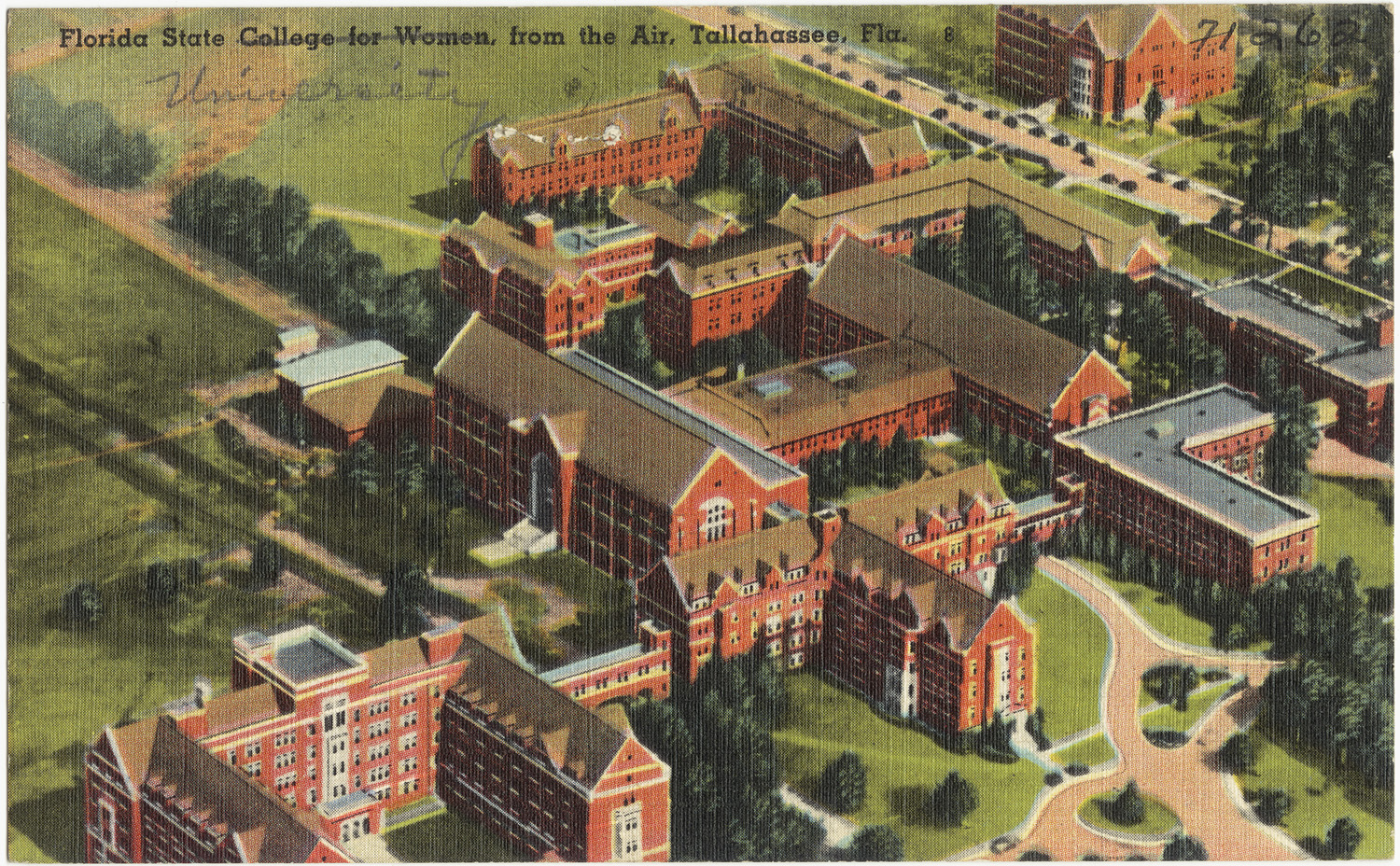
Florida State College for Women, circa 1930

The 1905 Florida Legislature passed the Buckman Act, which reorganized the Florida college system into a school for white men (University of the State of Florida), a school for white women (Florida Female College later changed to Florida State College for Women), and a school for African Americans (State Normal and Industrial College for Colored Students). The Buckman Act was controversial, as it changed the character of a historic coeducational state school into a school for women. The school's early and major benefactor, James Westcott III, willed substantial monies to support continued operations. In 1911, his estate sued the state educational board contending the estate was not intended to support a single-sex school. The Florida Supreme Court decided the issue in favor of the state, stating the change in character was within the intent of the Westcott will.

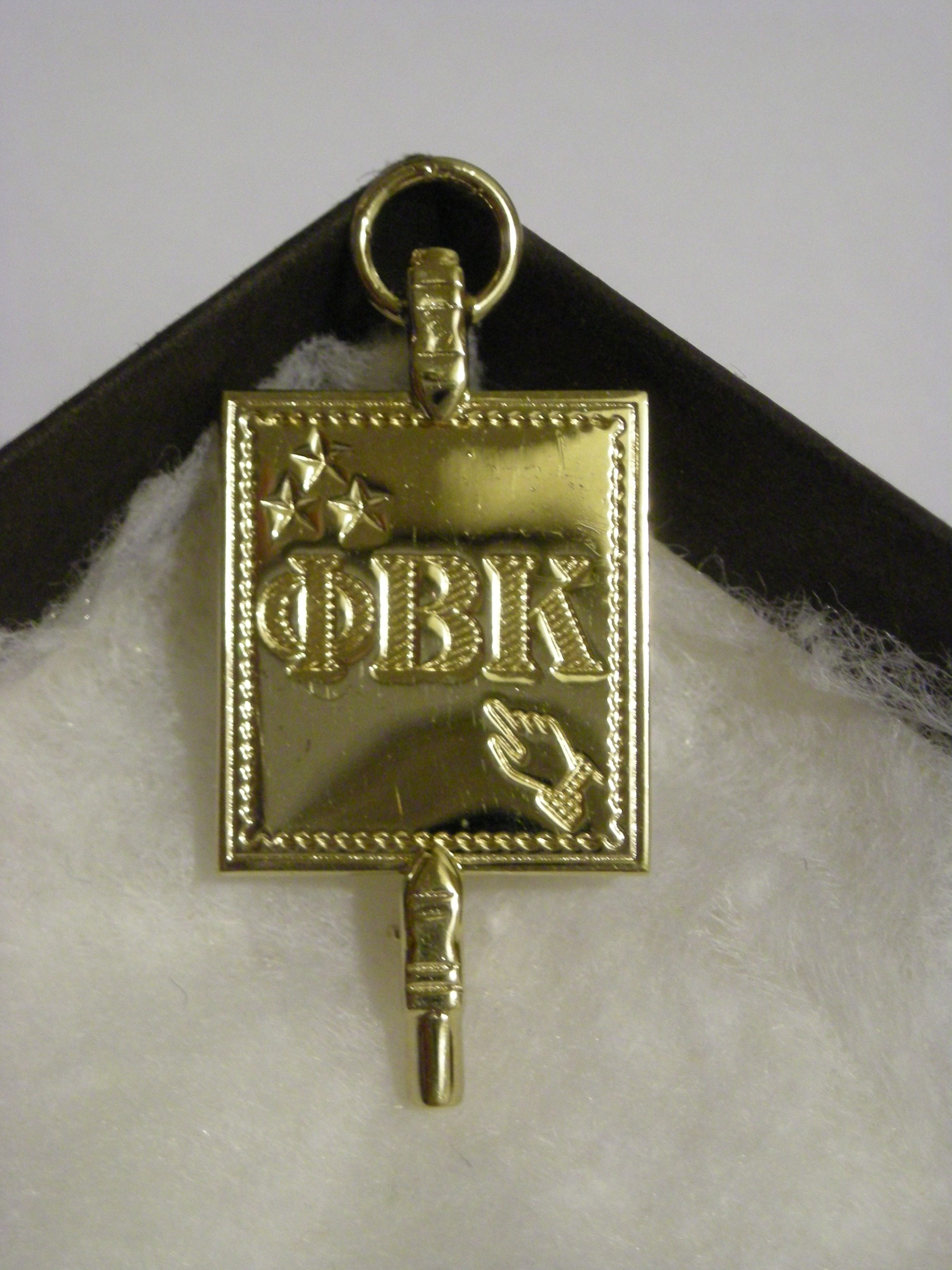
Phi Beta Kappa symbol. The stars stand for friendship, morality, and learning. Alpha of Florida is at FSU.

By 1933 the Florida State College for Women had grown to be the third largest women's college in the US. It was the first state women's college in the South to be awarded a chapter of Phi Beta Kappa, as well as the first university in Florida so honored. Florida State was the largest of the original two state universities in Florida until 1919.

=== Return to coeducational status ===
Returning soldiers using the G.I. Bill after World War II stressed the state university system to the point that a Tallahassee Branch of the University of Florida (TBUF) was opened on the campus of the Florida State College for Women with the men housed in barracks on nearby Dale Mabry Field. By 1947 the Florida Legislature returned the FSCW to coeducational status and designated it Florida State University. The FSU West Campus land and barracks plus other areas continually used as an airport later became the location of the Tallahassee Community College. The post-war years brought substantial growth and development to the university as many departments and colleges were added, including Business, Journalism (discontinued in 1959), Library Science, Nursing, and Social Welfare. Strozier Library (1956), and Tully Gymnasium (1956) were built at this time.

=== Activism ===
==== Civil rights ====
Florida State University ranked third in the United States for free speech and thought in a ranking released in 2024 by the Foundation for Individual Rights and Expression.

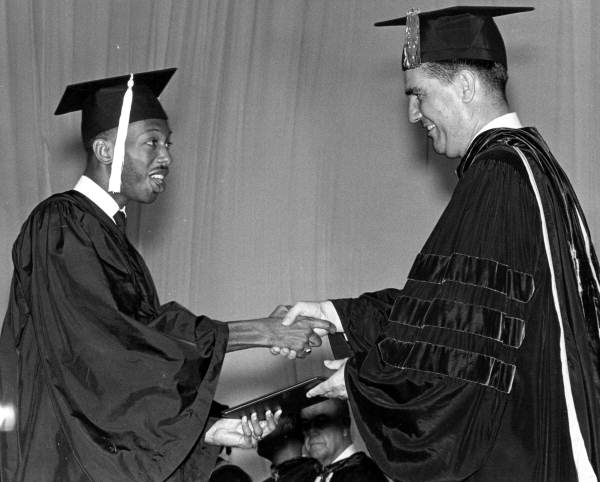
Max Courtney receiving his bachelor's degree from Florida State University president John E. Champion.

After many years as a whites-only university, in 1962, Maxwell Courtney became the first African-American undergraduate student admitted to Florida State. Fred Flowers joined the FSU baseball team as the first African-American athlete in university history in 1965. In 1966 Lenny Hall became the first African-American basketball player for Florida State. In 1968 Calvin Patterson became the first African-American player for the university football team.

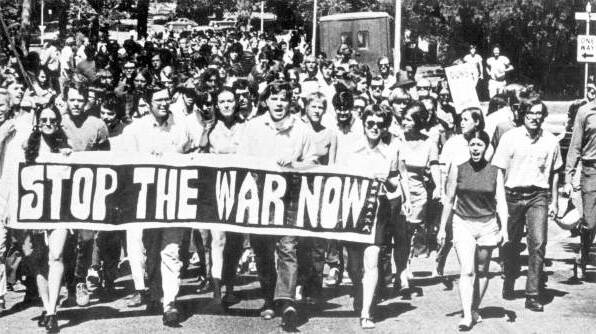
Student protest in Tallahassee, 1970

During the 1960s and 1970s Florida State University became a center for student activism especially in the areas of racial integration, women's rights, and opposition to the Vietnam War. The school acquired the nickname "Berkeley of the South" during this period, about similar student activities at the University of California, Berkeley. The school is also said to have originated the 1970s fad of "streaking," said to have been first observed on Landis Green.

In 1972 Margaret Menzel, a professor in the biology department, led a class-action lawsuit charging discrimination against women in pay and promotion. The case was settled in 1975 with an agreement that the university would establish a task force to investigate bias against women at the university and to revise its anti-nepotism policy so as to not discriminate against the wives of university employees. Bill Wade, a gay male student, was elected homecoming princess using the name "Billie Dahhling" in 1980. While Wade's election may initially have been more college prank than protest, the controversy of the social acceptance of homosexuality was evident at FSU in the 1980s. Official university policy established in 2013 prohibits discrimination against multiple protected groups, including the LGBT community.

=== Medicine and preeminence ===
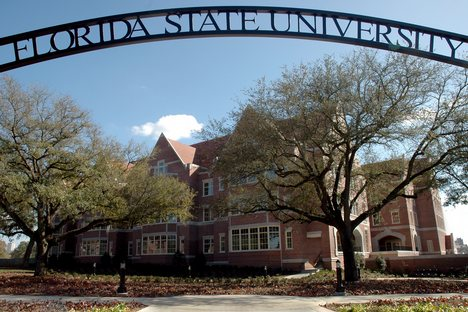
College of Medicine

The Florida Legislature approved the creation of the allopathic Florida State University College of Medicine in June 2000 due to a need for medical doctors, especially in primary care fields. It was the first medical school approved in the United States in almost two decades. The King Life Sciences Building, located next to the College of Medicine, was added June 2008, to complement medical research with research in related fields.

In 2013 the Florida Legislature and the Florida Board of Governors designated Florida State University and the University of Florida as the first two "preeminent universities" among the twelve universities of the State University System of Florida. The status is based on objective criteria and must be earned annually. The shared goal of having top national universities in Florida is highly political, often centering on the use of the term "flagship," a poorly defined and frequently inflammatory informal title.

=== Campus shootings ===
Two school shootings have occurred on the university campus since 2014. The first shooting occurred on November 20, 2014, when a shooter injured three and was shot dead by police. The second shooting occurred on April 17, 2025, where two people were killed and six others injured before the shooter was shot and injured by responding police.

== Campus ==
=== Main campus – Tallahassee ===
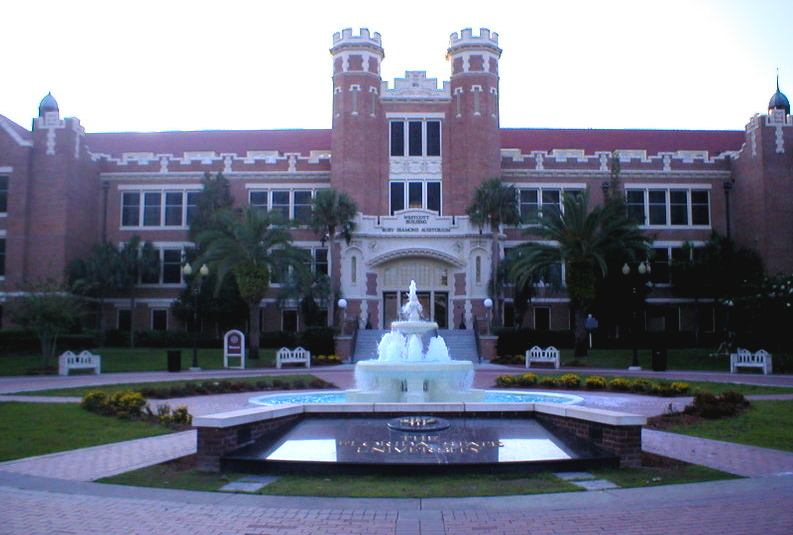
Westcott Plaza

The state acquired the land of the main campus from the City of Tallahassee in January 1857 when the Florida Institute was transferred. The main campus consists of 485.87 acres (2.0 km^{2}). Outside Leon County the university owns more than 1,715 acres (6.94 km^{2}). The main campus is bordered by Stadium Drive to the west, Tennessee Street (U.S. Route 90) to the north, Macomb Street to the east, and Gaines Street to the south. The Westcott Building is the school's readily identifiable structure at College Avenue and S. Copeland Street. The Westcott location is the oldest continuously used site of higher education in Florida and is the home of Ruby Diamond Concert Hall which serves as the university's primary performance venue.

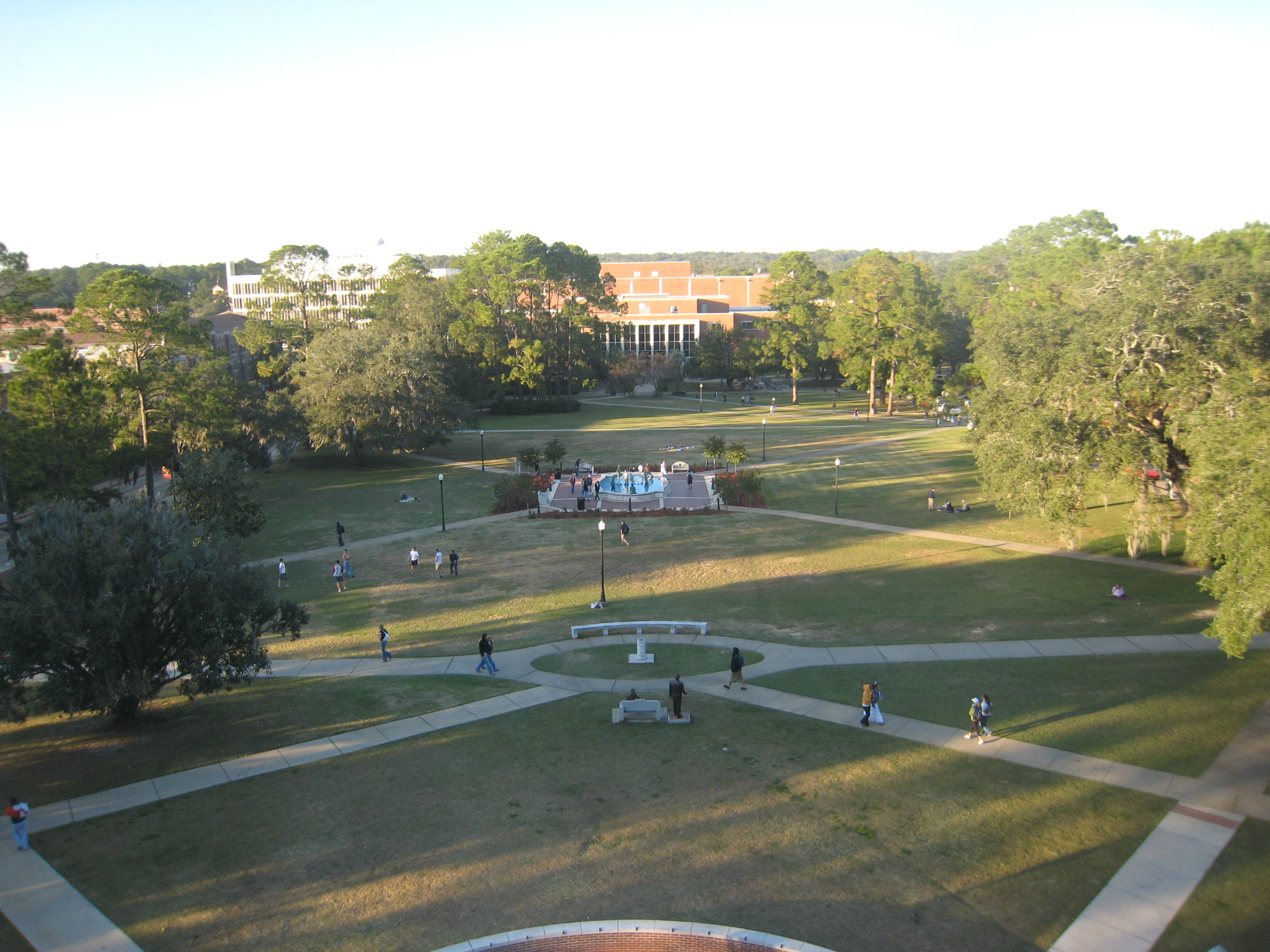
Landis Green is located in the center of the main campus

Historic student housing residence halls include Broward, Bryan, Cawthon, Gilchrist, Jennie Murphree, Landis, and Reynolds and are located on the older eastern half of campus. Newer residence hall complexes, Ragans and Wildwood, located near the athletic quadrant; and DeGraff Hall, located on Tennessee Street.

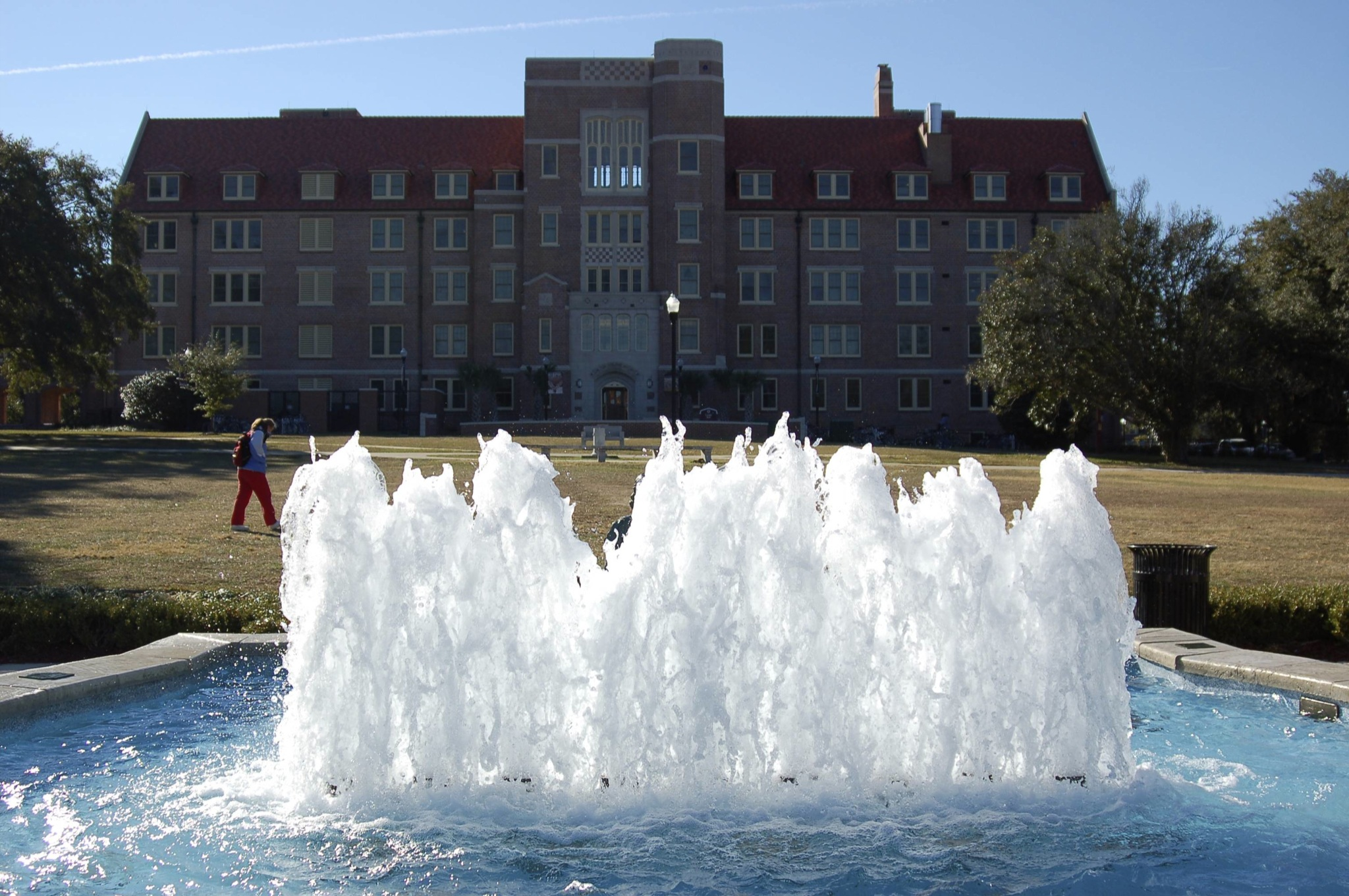
Legacy Fountain on Landis Green

On and around the Florida State University main campus are seven libraries: Robert Manning Strozier Library, Dirac Science Library named after the Nobel Prize-winning physicist and Florida State University professor Paul Dirac, Claude Pepper Library, College of Music Allen Music Library, College of Law Research Center, College of Medicine Maguire Medical Library and the FAMU/FSU Engineering Library. Strozier Library is located at the center of the campus and is open extended hours during Fall and Spring semesters.

A green space near Landis and Gilchrist residence halls, on the main campus. These oak trees were planted by students in 1932.

Next to the Donald L. Tucker Center, the College of Law is between Jefferson Street and Pensacola Street. The College of Business is in the heart of campus near the FSU Student Union and across from the HCB Classroom Building. The science and research quad is located in the northwest quadrant of the campus. The College of Medicine, King Life Science buildings (biology) as well as the Department of Psychology are located on the west end of campus on Call Street and Stadium Drive.

Located off Stadium Drive in the southwest quadrant is the University Center, which encloses Doak Campbell Stadium and Bobby Bowden Field. The stadium seats 79,560 spectators. Doak Campbell Stadium is contained within the brick facade walls of the University Center. It is reportedly the largest continuous brick structure in the United States and one of the largest in the world. The brick complex also houses offices of the university, the registrar, the Dedman School of Hospitality, and classrooms.

The FSU Southwest Campus was acquired by the university in 1930 and was formerly known as "The Farm". It encompasses another 740 acres (3.0 km^{2}) of land off Orange Drive. The southwest campus currently houses the Florida A&M University – Florida State University College of Engineering, which is housed in a two-building joint facility with Florida A&M University. In addition to the College of Engineering, The Don Veller Seminole Golf Course and Club are located here and at the Morcom Aquatics Center. The FSU Research Foundation buildings, as well as the National High Magnetic Field Laboratory, are located on the Southwest Campus in Innovation Park.

=== Other campuses ===
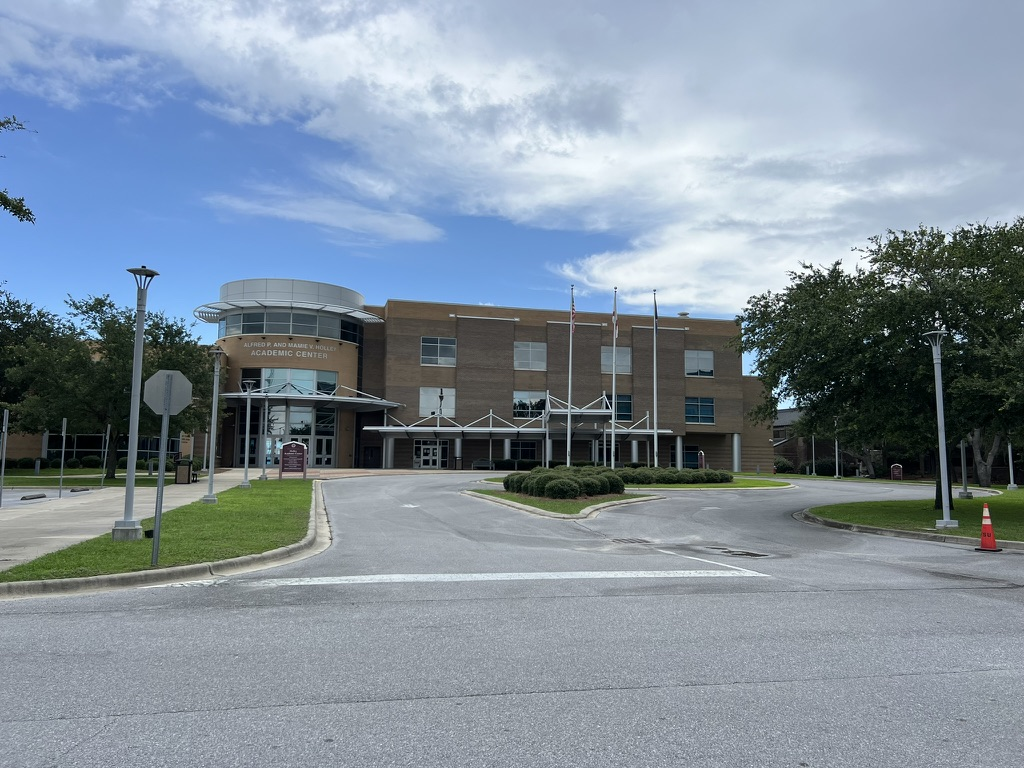
Holley Academic Center on Panama City, FL campus

Florida State University Panama City is located approximately 100 miles (160 km) from the main campus. The campus began operations in 1967, and FSU assumed control in July 1982. The Bay County Commission donated a 26-acre waterfront site for a new campus, which was completed in 1987. In Fall, 2023 the campus had over 1200 students engaged in undergraduate and graduate degree programs. The satellite institution currently has a ratio of 20 students to each faculty member.

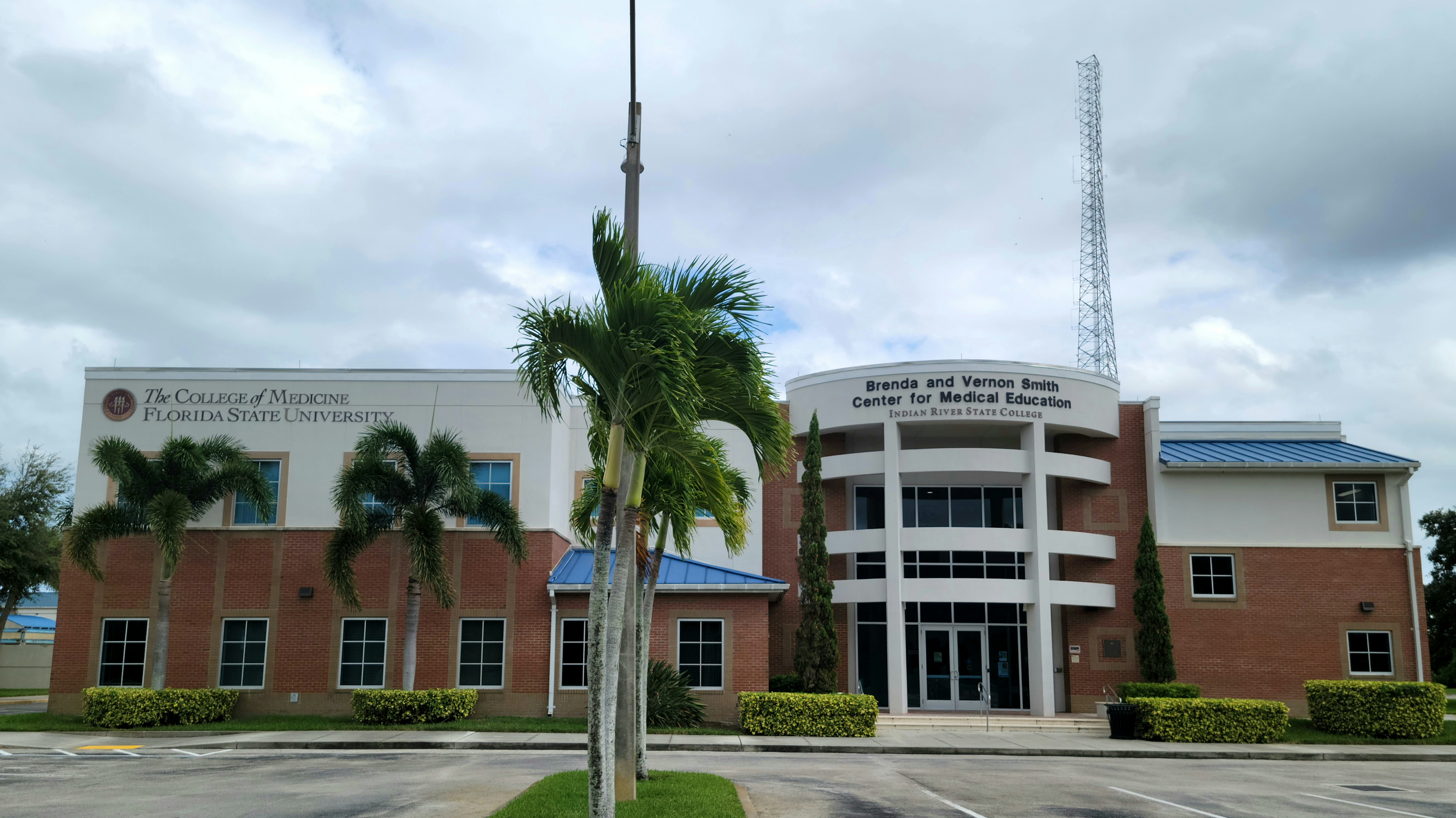
College of Medicine Smith Center at Ft.Pierce, FL

The College of Medicine has six regional campuses located in Daytona Beach, Fort Pierce, Orlando, Pensacola, Sarasota and Tallahassee. Three rural based medical training facilities are located in Marianna, Immokalee and Thomasville, Georgia.

Florida State has campuses in London, Florence, Panama City, Panama and Valencia, Spain. These campuses are a part of the year-round international programs.

== Organization and administration ==
Florida State University is divided into 17 colleges and over 110 centers, facilities, labs, and institutes offering 277 degree programs.

College/school founding
| College/school | Year founded |
| College of Arts & Sciences | 1901 |
| College of Education | 1901 |
| College of Human Sciences | 1901 |
| College of Music | 1901 |
| College of Fine Arts | 1905 |
| College of Social Work | 1928 |
| School of Dance | 1929 |
| Askew School of Public Administration and Policy | 1947 |
| School of Communication | 1947 |
| Dedman School of Hospitality | 1947 |
| College of Business | 1950 |
| College of Nursing | 1950 |
| College of Criminology and Criminal Justice | 1951 |
| College of Law | 1966 |
| College of Social Sciences and Public Policy | 1973 |
| School of Theatre | 1973 |
| College of Engineering | 1982 |
| College of Motion Picture Arts | 1989 |
| College of Medicine | 2000 |
| School of Communication Science and Disorders | 2009 |
| College of Applied Studies | 2010 |
| Jim Moran School of Entrepreneurship | 2017 |
| School of Physician Assistant Practice | 2017 |

As a part of the State University System of Florida, Florida State University falls under the purview of the seventeen member Florida Board of Governors. Guided by the Board of Governors, the thirteen member Board of trustees is "responsible for the administration of its university in a manner that is dedicated to, and consistent with the university's mission which shall be otherwise consistent with the mission and purposes of the State University System as defined by the Board of Governors". The president of the university answers to the Board of Trustees. The university executive staff report to the president, with subordinate sections reporting through the staff.

The Faculty Senate is the legislative body for the university and elected from member of the general faculty. The Faculty Senate prepares academic policy and sets academic standards. Any action of the Faculty Senate is subject to the veto authority of the university president, which may be appealed to the university trustees by two-thirds Senate vote.

The student government was established in 1935 and consists of executive, judicial, and legislative branches. The student government executive branch is led by the student body president and includes the student body's vice president, treasurer, seven agencies, four bureaus, and an executive cabinet responsible for handling an agenda set out by the student body president. The legislative branch includes eighty senators, and the judicial branch consists of a chief justice and four associate justices, who must be in their second or third year of law school.

=== Relationship with the Seminole Tribe of Florida ===
Reforming male collegiate sports after the 42-year hiatus (1905–1947) when FSU was a women-only college, FSU students voted to use the name "Seminoles" as the university collective name and symbol. The Seminole imagery in some university activities is by permission of the Tribal Council, the governing body of the Seminole Tribe of Florida. FSU's use of the Seminole imagery was granted an NCAA waiver in 2005, due to the coordination the Seminole Tribe of Florida has with Florida State.

=== Finances ===
As of 2024 FSU's university-wide financial endowment was $785.2 million with total assets valued at $1.03 billion. The endowment helps provide scholarships to students, support teaching and research, and fund other specific purposes designated by donors.

In 2022 Florida State University was rated by Fitch, Moody's and S&P Global as having the highest credit rating of all universities in Florida. Moody's Ratings graded FSU debt at Aa1 and Aa2 in 2022. S&P Global Ratings rated the university AA+ overall in 2022. Fitch Ratings affirmed the FSU Issuer Default Rating at AA+ on February 14, 2022, with a stable outlook. Fitch's Analytical Conclusion states:

As a comprehensive flagship university, FSU has a statewide and even national draw for students and has considerable fundraising capabilities. The Stable Outlook reflects Fitch's expectation that the university will sustain adjusted cash flow margins, as defined in Fitch's criteria, in line with historical trends, and that balance sheet strength will be maintained and improve over time.

== Academics ==
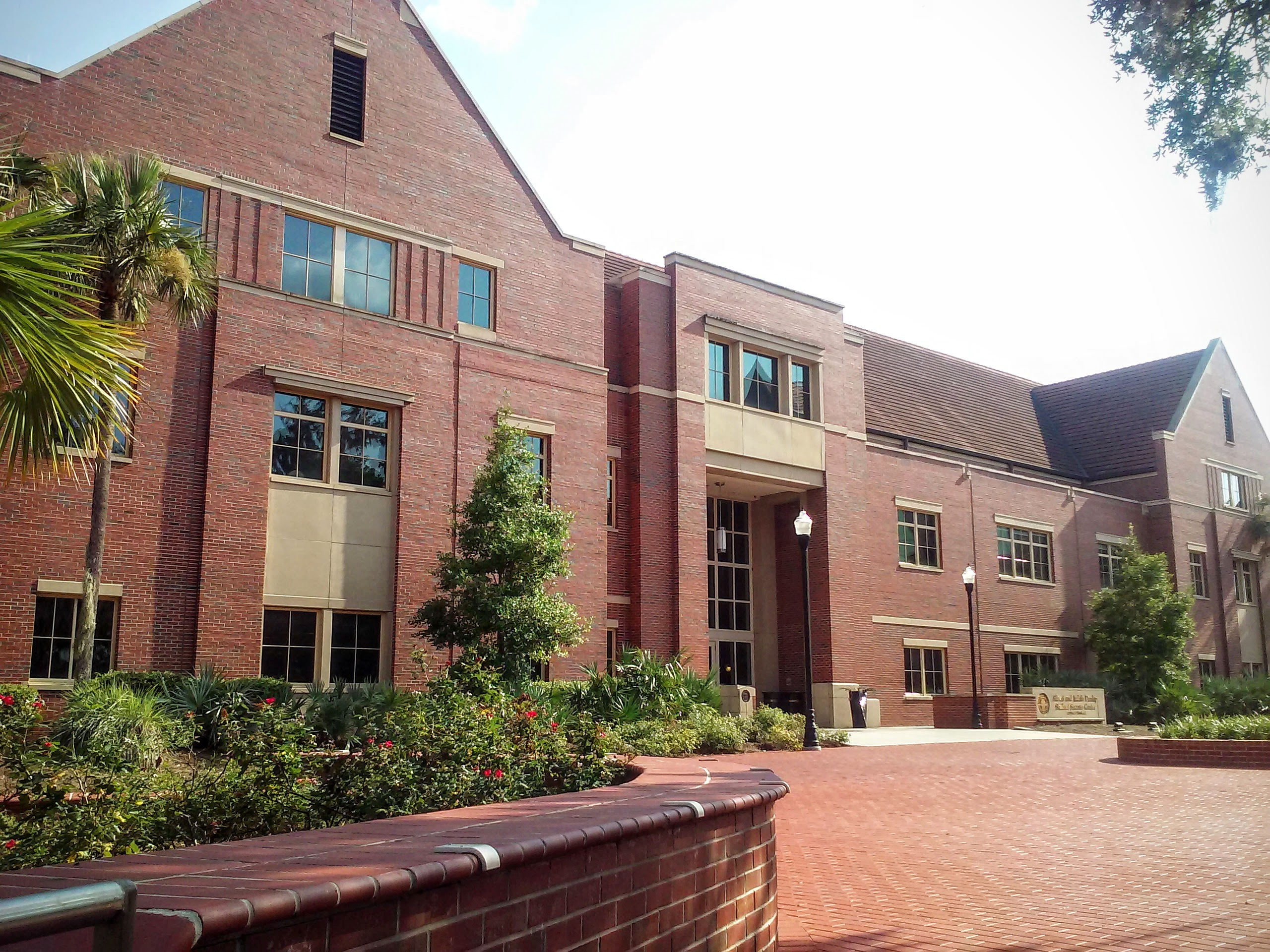
The Career Center

Florida State University aspires to become a top ten public research university and AAU member. The university is the home of the National High Magnetic Field Laboratory among other advanced research facilities. Other milestones at the university include the first ETA10-G/8 supercomputer and the development of the process to synthesize the anti-cancer drug Taxol.

Florida State University is divided into 17 colleges and schools including the Colleges of Applied Studies, Arts & Sciences, Business, Communication & Information, Criminology & Criminal Justice, Education, Engineering, Fine Arts, Human Sciences, Law, Medicine, Motion Picture Arts, Music, Nursing, Social Sciences & Public Policy, and Social Work, plus the Graduate School, Dedman School of Hospitality, and the Jim Moran School of Entrepreneurship. Florida State offers 103 baccalaureate degree programs, 107 master's degree programs, an advanced masters/specialist degree in 6 areas, 63 doctorate degree programs, and 3 professional degree programs. The most popular colleges by enrollment are Arts and Sciences, Business, Social Sciences, Education, and Human Science.

The Florida State University College of Medicine operates using diversified hospital and community-based clinical education medical training for medical students. The students spend their first two years in academic medical courses on the FSU campus in Tallahassee. They are then assigned to one of the regional medical school campuses for their third- and fourth-year clinical training. Rotations can be done at one of the six regional campuses in Daytona Beach, Fort Pierce, Orlando, Pensacola, Sarasota or in Tallahassee.

=== Admissions ===
Fall first-time freshman admission statistics
| | 2023 | 2022 | 2021 |
|---|---|---|---|
| Applicants | 74,038 | 78,088 | 65,256 |
| Admits | 18,793 | 19,552 | 24,184 |
| Enrolls | 5,890 | 6,033 | 7,619 |
| Admit rate | 25.4% | 25.0% | 37.1% |
| Yield rate | 31.3% | 30.9% | 31.5% |
| SAT composite* | 1250–1380 (66%†) | 1220–1360 (68%†) | 1200–1330 (65%†) |
| ACT composite* | 27–31 (32.4%†) | 26–31 (32%†) | 26–30 (35%†) |
* middle 50% range † percentage of first-time freshmen who chose to submit

The average admitted student of the Fall 2023 entering freshmen class had a weighted GPA of 4.26. For the class, the 25th to 75th percentile standardized test score ranges were 1250 to 1380 for the SAT and 27 to 31 for the ACT. The acceptance rate for admission in 2023 was 25.4% for 74,038 freshman applicants.

FSU's second-year, full-time freshman retention rate is 96% and a four-year graduation rate of 75%. The university has an 83.0% six-year graduation rate.

=== Enrollment ===
Enrollment in FSU (2017–2022)
| Academic Year | Undergraduates | Graduate | Total Enrollment |
|---|---|---|---|
| 2020–2021 | 32,543 | 11,026 | 43,569 |
| 2021–2022 | 33,593 | 11,537 | 45,130 |
| 2022–2023 | 32,936 | 11,225 | 44,161 |

Florida State University students, numbering 44,308 in 2024, came from more than 130 countries, and all 50 U.S. states. The ratio of women to men is 58:42, and 24.2 percent are graduate and professional students.

Miami-Dade, Broward, Palm Beach, Hillsborough, and Leon County make up the Florida counties with the greatest enrollment of in-state students. Students from Georgia, New York, New Jersey, North Carolina, Texas, Pennsylvania, and Illinois make up the largest states for out-of-state students.

FSU hosts about 2500 international students. Around seventy-seven percent of the international students are graduate students and come from mainly China, India, South Korea, Panama, and Turkey.

=== Rankings ===
Academic rankings

National
- Forbes: 67
- U.S. News & World Report: 54 (tie)
- Washington Monthly: 73
- WSJ/College Pulse: 173

Global
- ARWU: 201–300
- QS: 549
- THE: 251–300
- U.S. News & World Report: 310 (tie)

USNWR graduate school rankings
| Business | 85 |
| Education | 21 |
| Engineering | 92 |
| Law | 47 |
| Medicine: Primary Care | 78 |
| Medicine: Research | 93–123 |
| Nursing: Doctorate | 33 |

USNWR departmental rankings
| Biological Sciences | 80 |
| Chemistry | 49 |
| Clinical Psychology | 27 |
| Computer Science | 82 |
| Criminology | 5 |
| Earth Sciences | 62 |
| Economics | 65 |
| English | 62 |
| Fine Arts | 42 |
| History | 81 |
| Library and Information Studies | 11 |
| Mathematics | 70 |
| Physics | 53 |
| Political Science | 41 |
| Psychology | 62 |
| Public Affairs | 46 |
| Public Health | 79 |
| Social Work | 42 |
| Sociology | 49 |
| Speech-Language Pathology | 20 |
| Statistics | 30 |

Florida State University is one of the two original state-designated "preeminent" universities in Florida. Florida State University receives the highest National Science Foundation research and development award in the state. Princeton Review's 2024 Best Value Colleges ranked FSU the top public university in Florida and sixteenth nationally.

For 2022, U.S. News & World Report ranked Florida State University as the 19th best public university in the United States, and 55th overall among all national universities, public and private. For 2019, the FSU College of Business was ranked 27th undergraduate program among all public universities and 44th among all national universities. In 2017, Florida State was ranked one of the most efficient universities.

Florida State is ranked the 16th best doctorate-granting university in the US for the highest amount of African American doctorate recipients by the National Science Foundation. Florida State is ranked the 29th top college in the United States by Payscale and CollegeNet's Social Mobility Index college rankings(2014).

=== International programs ===
Florida State University's International Programs (FSU IP) is ranked 11th in the nation among university study abroad programs. Every year Florida State consistently sends over 2,379 students across the world to study in multiple locations.

Florida State has four permanent study centers providing residential and academic facilities in London; Florence, Italy; Valencia, Spain; and Panama City, Panama.

=== Center for Academic Retention & Enhancement ===
The FSU Center for Academic Retention and Enhancement (CARE) provides preparation, orientation, and academic support programming for first-generation college students who are disadvantaged by economical and educational circumstances. CARE provides academic support services such as a dedicated tutoring and computer lab as well as advising and life coaching.

The Unconquered Scholars Program of CARE is for students who were previously homeless, wards of the state or in foster care. Transition programs in CARE work as a bridge into the university.

=== Florida State University Libraries ===
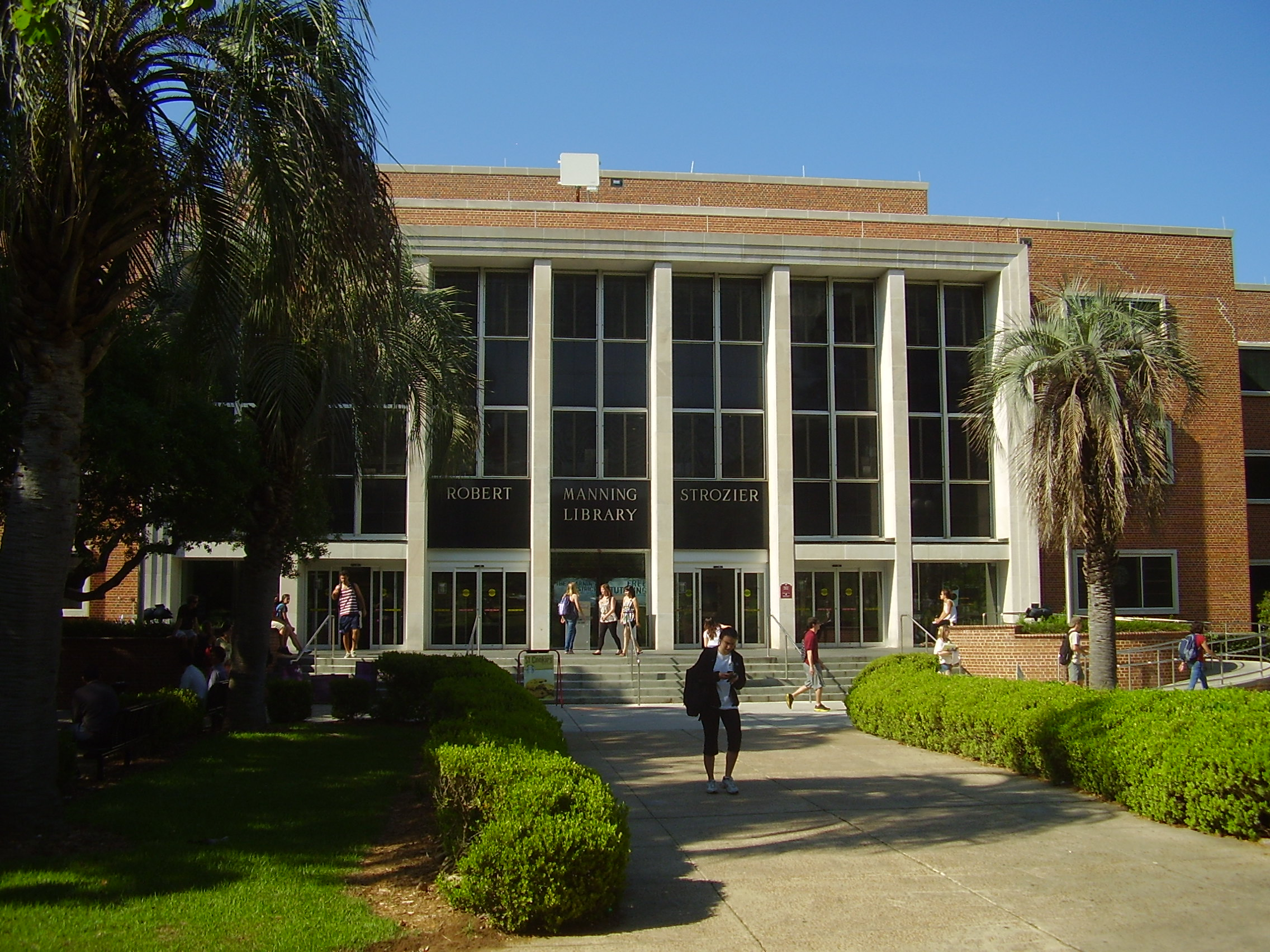
The Robert M. Strozier Library

The Florida State University Libraries alone include more than 4 million titles and offers access to more than 1,064 databases and 120,000 electronic journals, including the statewide UBorrow system which includes over 15 million books from all 40 state university and college libraries. In total, Florida State has fifteen libraries and millions of books and journals to choose from, including a strong statewide UBorrow system. Eight libraries are located on the main Tallahassee campus, with the other seven located all over the world. The collection covers virtually all disciplines and includes a wide array of formats – from books and journals to manuscripts, maps, and recorded music. Increasingly collections are digital and are accessible on the Internet via the library web page or the library catalog.

The Robert M. Strozier Library is Florida State's main library. It is located in the historic central area of the campus adjacent to Landis Green. FSU has had a library since the 1880s, and the main library has been housed in several buildings.

The Paul A. M. Dirac Science Library, which opened in December 1989, is the main science library for Florida State University and houses over 500,000 books. The library building is also home to the FSU School of Computational Science and Information Technology. The library houses a collection of materials related to Dirac's work at FSU and Cambridge University. These papers, donated by Dirac's wife from 1984 to 1997, include photographs, lecture notes, and personal belongings that were left in his office when he passed. There is a marble statue featuring Dirac located outside of the library.

The Claude Pepper Center on campus is located in what was originally the Florida State College for Women Library, which served as studios for WFSU-TV in past years. The center is also home to the Reuben O'Donovan Askew Papers.

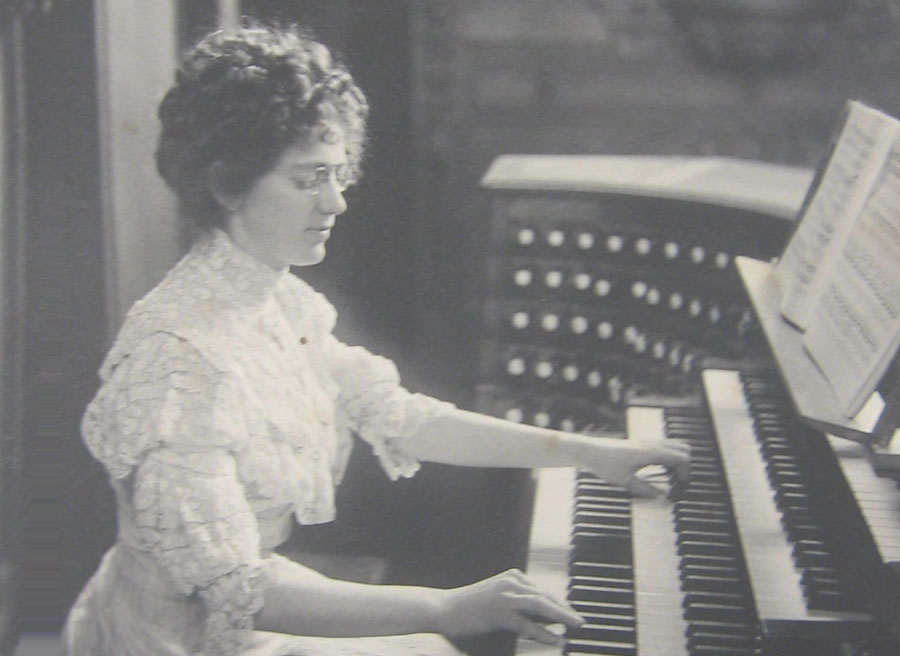
Ella Scoble Opperman circa 1910

The Warren D. Allen Music Library is located in the Housewright Music Building in the Florida State University College of Music and contains scores, sound recordings (albums and CDs), video recordings, books, periodicals, microforms and streaming media.

The Harold Goldstein Library was a library on the main campus that housed a collection relating to library and information science, information technology, and juvenile literature. In 2018, the Goldstein Library was replaced with the Innovation Hub, a technology hub, makerspace, and design-thinking center. When the Goldstein Library closed, its collections were split among the main library, Strozier, while the IT materials were moved to Dirac.

The Florida State University College of Law Research Center houses the official library of the Florida State University College of Law. Located in B. K. Roberts Hall, the library has digital holdings, amassed by the Florida Academic Law Libraries in cooperation with other state and private colleges and universities. The library also maintains subscriptions and access to 116 law-specific databases which can be accessed by students.

In addition to the libraries located on the Tallahassee campus, FSU has five other libraries, museums, and research centers. These include the FSU Panama City Florida Library and Learning Center, the FSU Panama, Republic of Panama Library, the John and Mable Ringling Museum of Art, the FSU Florence, Italy Study Center, and the FSU London, England Study Center.

=== Museums ===
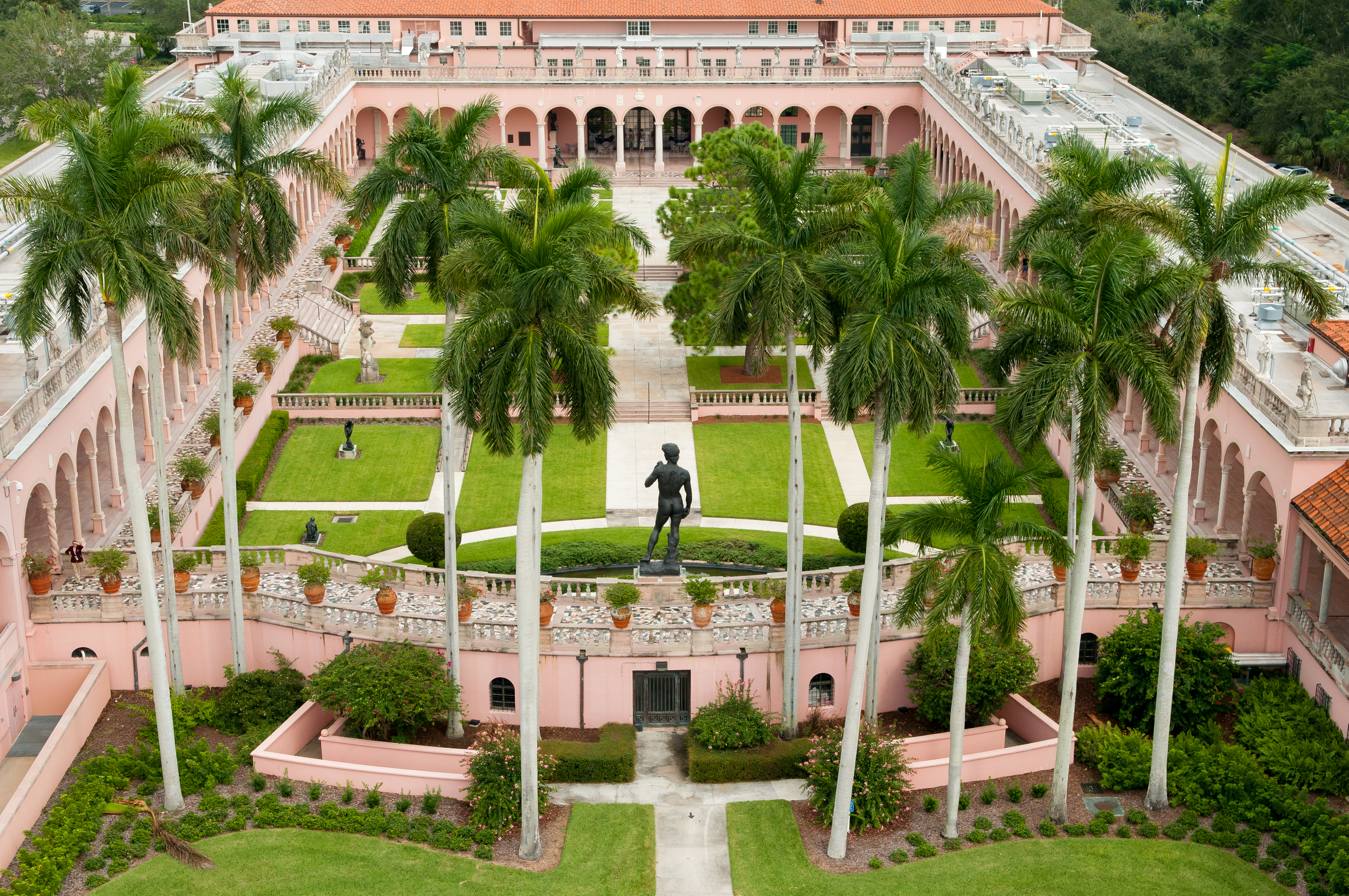
Ringling Museum of Art courtyard

The Ringling, the State Art Museum of Florida, is located in Sarasota, Florida and is administered by Florida State University. The museum opened in 1930. The institution offers twenty-one galleries of European paintings as well as Cypriot antiquities and Asian, American, and contemporary art. The museum's art collection currently consists of more than 10,000 objects that include a wide variety of paintings, sculpture, drawings, prints, photographs, and decorative arts from ancient through contemporary periods and from around the world. Celebrated items include eight Peter Paul Rubens paintings. The Ringling Museum collections constitute one of the largest university museum complexes in the United States. In 2014 the Ringling was selected as the second most popular attraction in Florida by the readers of USAToday Travel. Florida State University also maintains the FSU Museum of Fine Arts (MoFA) on the Tallahassee main campus.

== Research ==
Taxol total synthesis by Holton overview

The Carnegie Classification of Institutions of Higher Education ranks Florida State as a doctoral research institution which performs very high levels of research. Florida State presently rates second in the state of Florida as a public university by the Nature Index for research output. The university engages in many areas of academic inquiry at the undergraduate, graduate, and postdoctoral levels. Florida State University was awarded over $414 million in annual research expenditures in sponsored research in fiscal year 2023, ranking it 79th out of 890 ranked. FSU receives the highest National Science Foundation funding in the state of Florida. Florida State currently has 37 degree programs in interdisciplinary research fields. Interdisciplinary programs merge academic disciplines into common areas where discoveries may be exploited by more than one method. Interdisciplinary research at FSU covers traditional subjects such as chemistry, physics and engineering to social sciences.

=== Notable research ===
==== National High Magnetic Field Laboratory ====
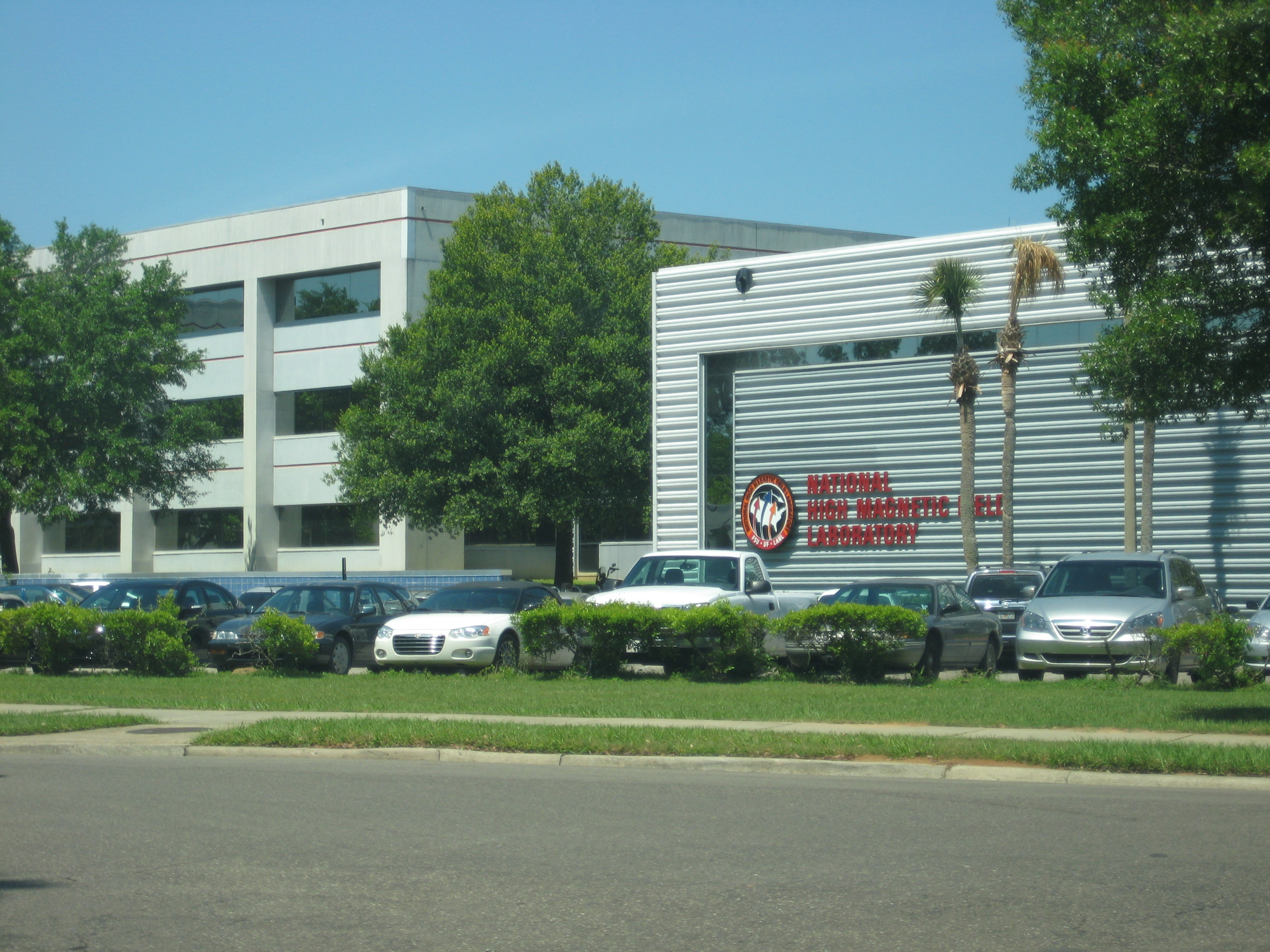
National High Magnetic Field Laboratory building

The National High Magnetic Field Laboratory (NHMFL) or "Mag Lab" at Florida State develops and operates high magnetic field facilities that scientists use for research in physics, biology, bioengineering, chemistry, geochemistry, biochemistry, materials science, and engineering. It is a unique facility in the United States and one of only nine worldwide. Significant records have been set at the Mag Lab to date. The Magnetic Field Laboratory is a 440,000 sq. ft (40,877 square meter) complex employing 715 faculty, staff, graduate, and postdoctoral students. This facility is the largest and highest powered laboratory of its kind in the world.

===== MIT Contest of lab award =====
In 1990 the National Science Foundation (NSF) awarded Florida State University the right to host the new National High Magnetic Field Laboratory. Rather than improve the existing Francis Bitter Magnet Laboratory controlled by the Massachusetts Institute of Technology (MIT) together with a consortium of other universities, the NSF elected to move the Lab mainly to Florida State University, with a smaller facility at the University of Florida. MIT contested the award in an unprecedented request to the National Science Board (NSB) for a review of the award, accusing NSF officials of manipulating facts, in that the NSB overruled a peer-reviewed process awarding the lab to MIT in favor of long-term State of Florida support for the facility and faculty. The NSB denied the appeal, and the NSF considered the matter closed.

==== High Energy Physics ====
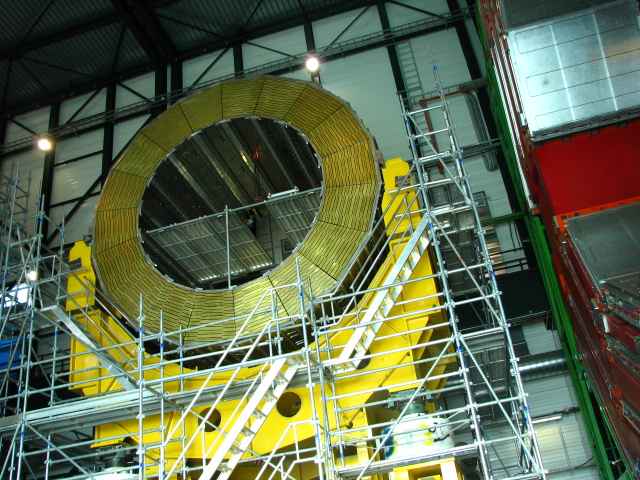
The Hadron Calorimeter at CERN

The High Energy Physics program at Florida State was established in 1950 and collaborates with the Fermi National Accelerator Laboratory (also known as Fermilab), near Chicago, IL, and with CERN, the European Center of Nuclear Research located near Geneva, Switzerland. Current interests include the basic structure of matter.

==== High-Performance Materials Institute ====
The High-Performance Materials Institute (HPMI) is a multidisciplinary research institute investigating materials suitable for advanced applications including artificial limbs and space travel.

==== Coastal and Marine Laboratory ====
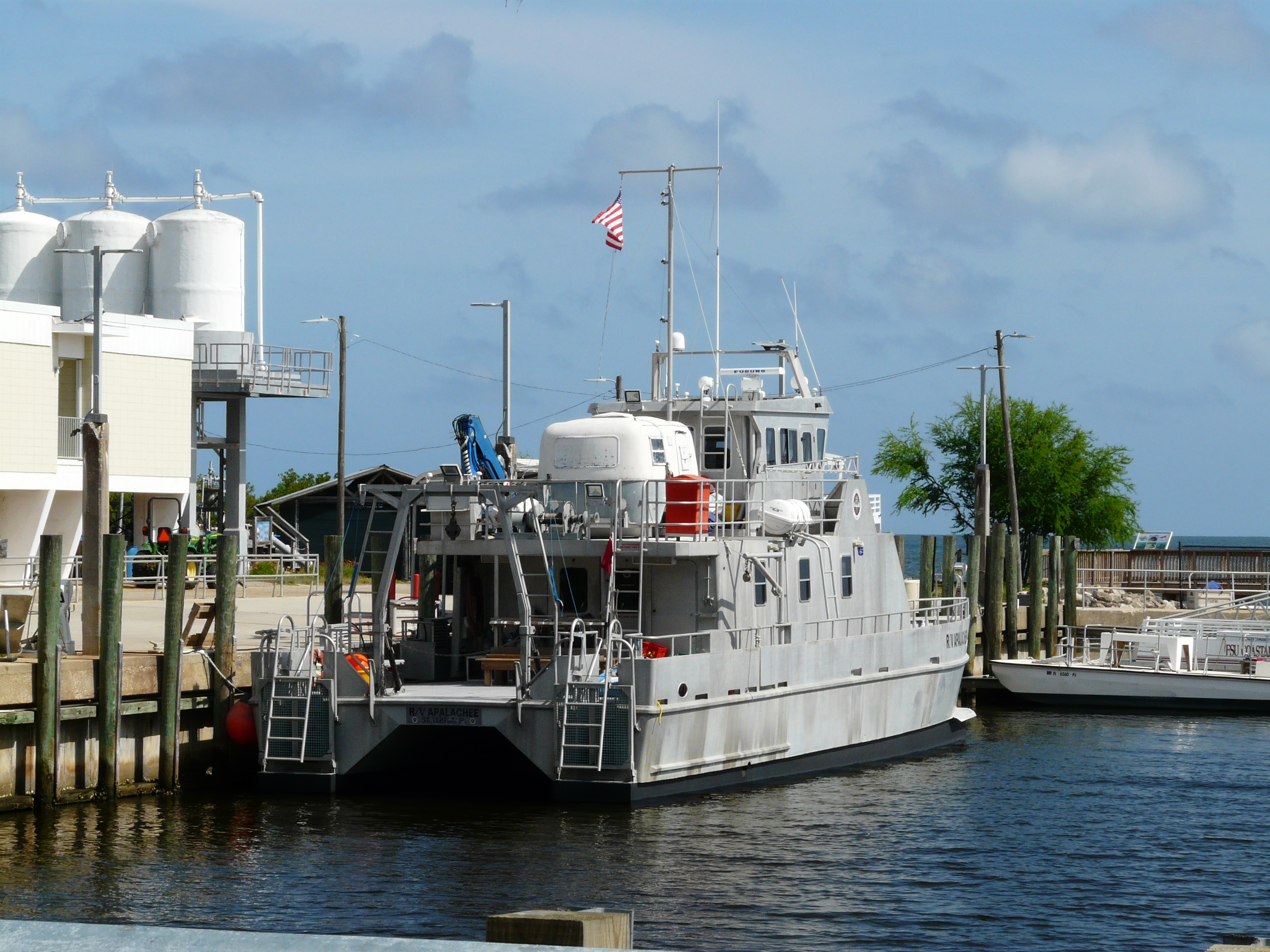
R/V Apalachee

FSU's Coastal and Marine Laboratory researches coastal and marine ecosystems, using the research vessel Apalachee. The facility is located in St. Teresa, Florida (on the coast) and can house students and researchers for extended times.

==== FAMU-FSU College of Engineering ====
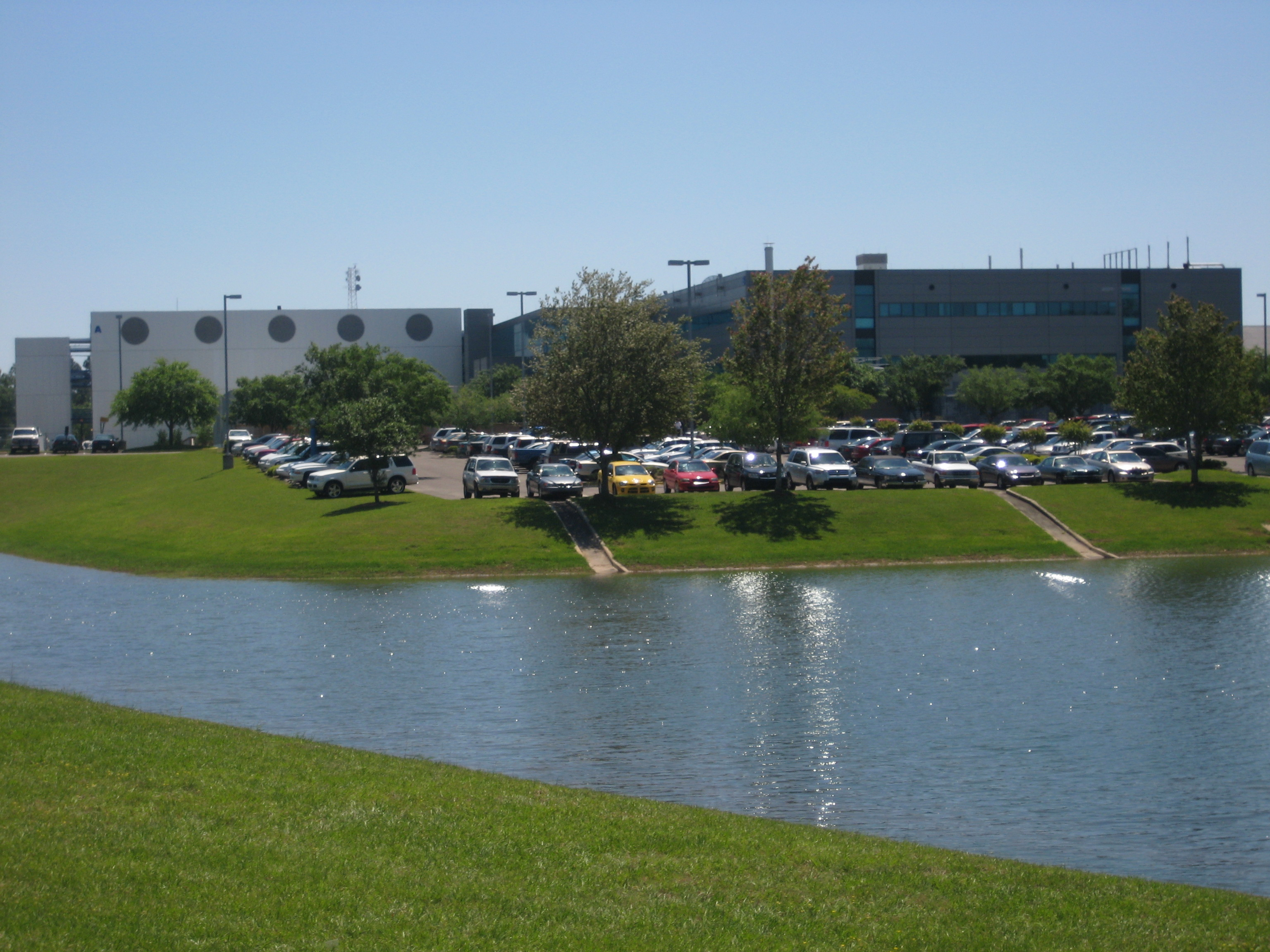
FAMU-FSU College of Engineering

The Florida Agricultural and Mechanical University-FSU College of Engineering is a partnership between an HBCU, a public Research 1 University and the National High Magnetic Field Laboratory. Students complete basic studies at their respective university, then complete requirements at the College of Engineering. The college has undergraduate and graduate degree programs in chemical, civil, computer, electrical, industrial, biomedical and mechanical engineering.

== Student life ==
Undergraduate demographics as of Fall 2023
| Race and ethnicity | Total |
|---|---|
| White | 58% |
| Hispanic | 23% |
| Black | 7% |
| Asian | 4% |
| Two or more races | 4% |
| International student | 2% |
| Unknown | 1% |
Economic diversity
| Low-income (Note: The percentage of students who received an income-based federal Pell grant intended for low-income students.) | 26% |
| Affluent (Note: The percentage of students who are a part of the American middle class at the bare minimum.) | 74% |

=== Traditions ===
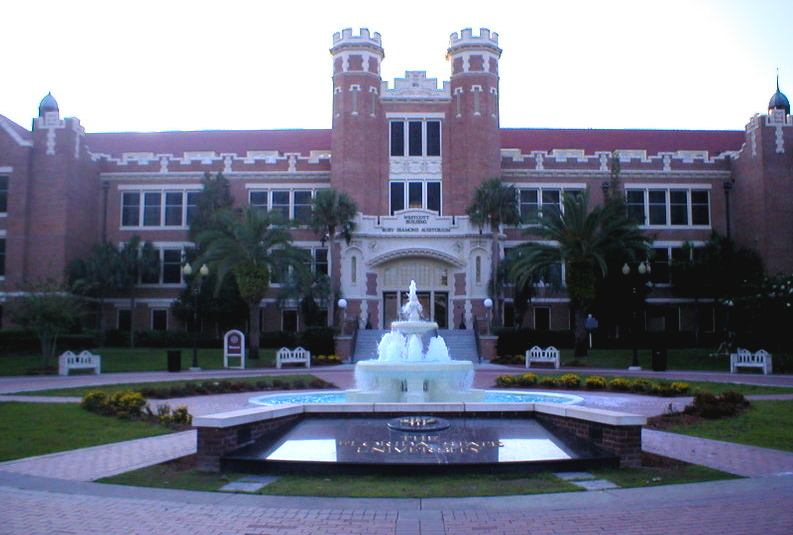
It is traditional for students to be dunked in the Westcott fountain on special occasions

The university's colors are garnet and gold. Florida State University's marching band is the Marching Chiefs.

==== Alma mater ====
The alma mater for Florida State University was composed by Charlie Carter in 1956.

The most popular songs of Florida State University include:

- Alma Mater – "High O'er Towering Pines"
- Hymn – "Hymn To the Garnet and the Gold"
- Fight Song – "FSU Fight Song"

=== Residential life ===
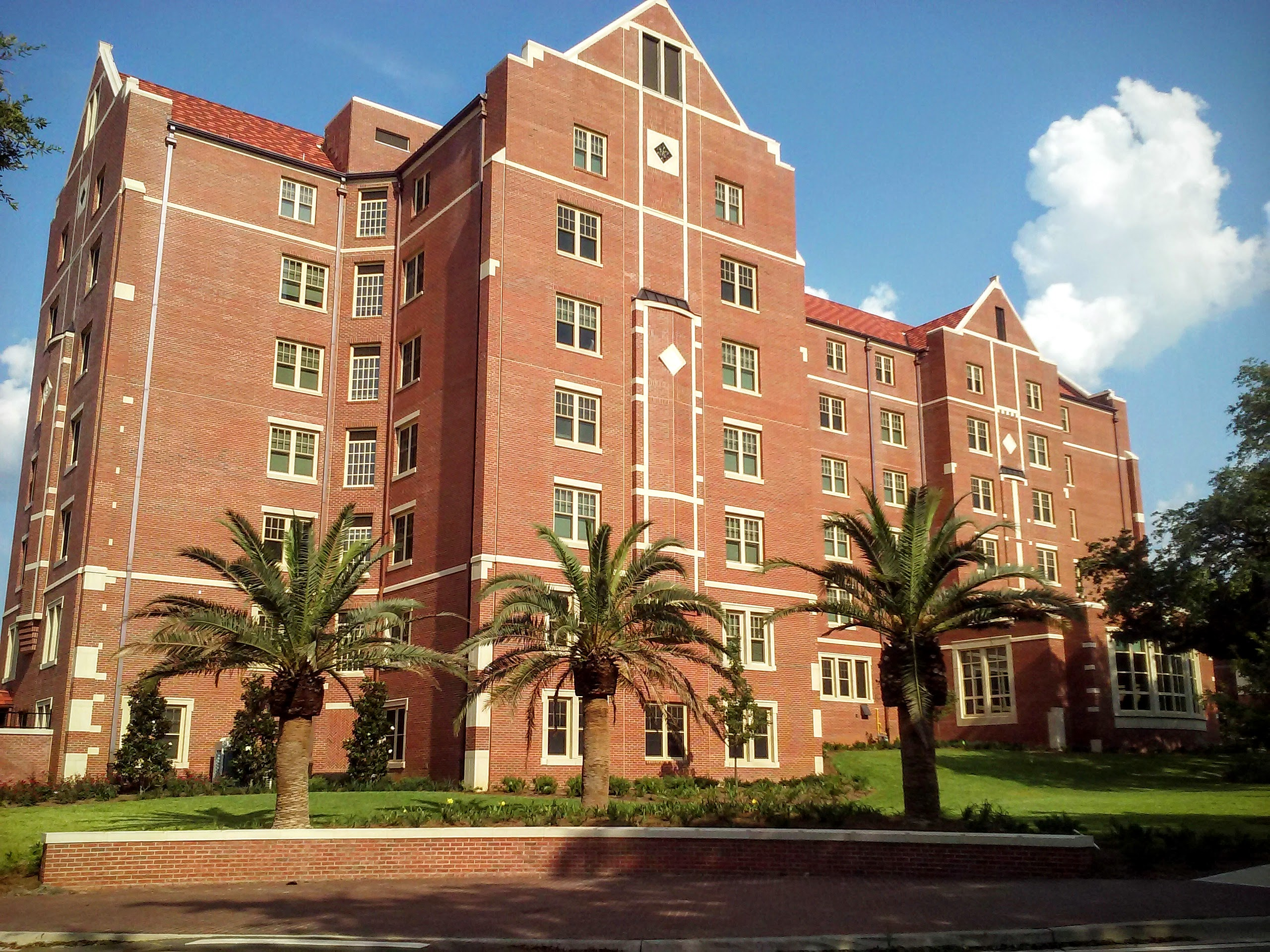
Dorman & Deviney Halls complex

Florida State University is a traditional residential university wherein most students live on campus in university residence halls or nearby in privately owned residence halls, apartments and residences. Florida State University provides 6,387 undergraduate and graduate students with housing as well as Living–Learning Communities (LLC) on the main campus. The university now offers video tours and other remote access information.

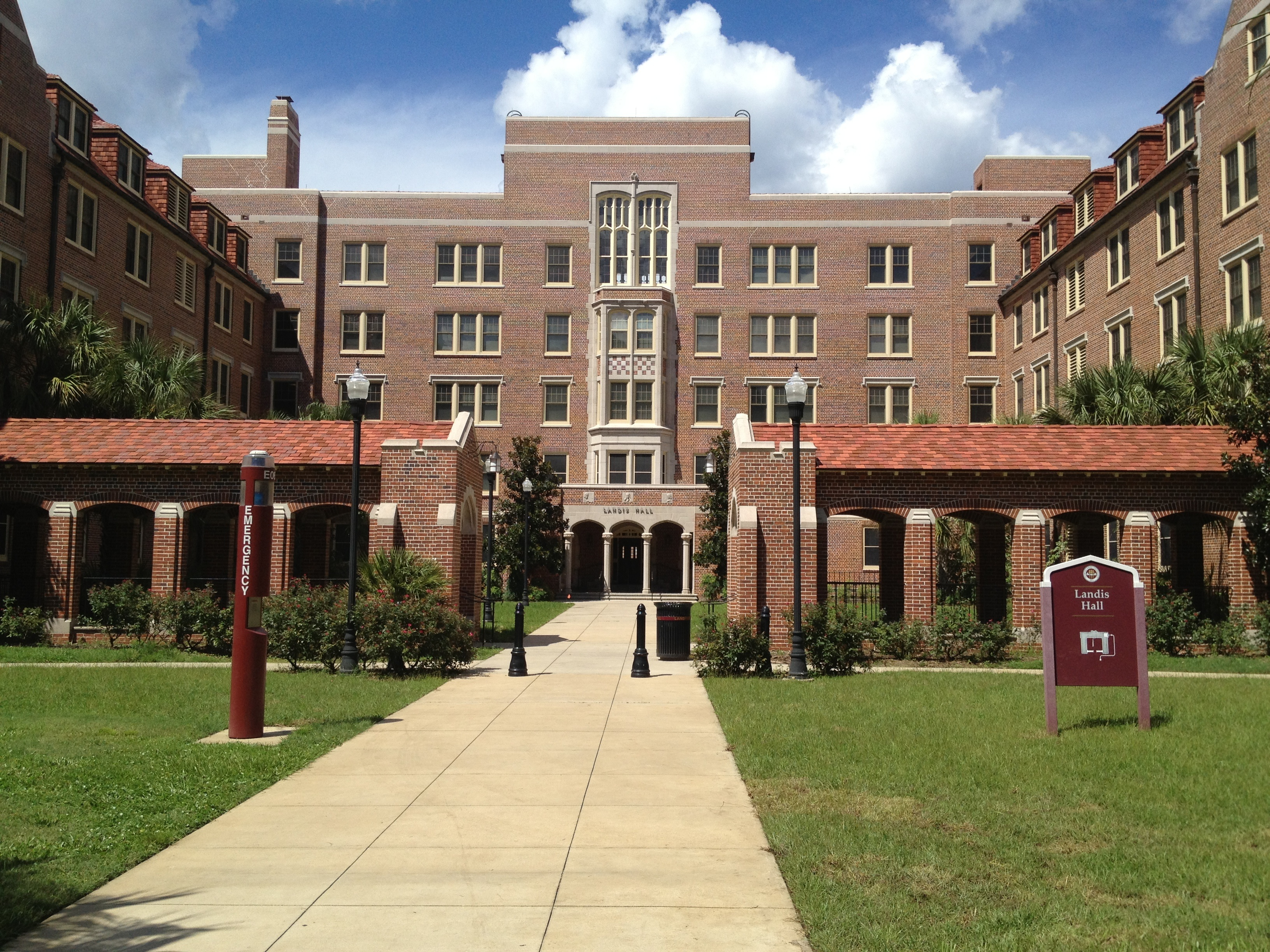
Landis Hall dormitory, honors students dormitory

=== Student clubs and activities ===
Florida State University has more than 650 Recognized Student Organizations (RSOs) for students to join. They range from athletic, cultural and musical to philanthropy, including Phi Beta Kappa, AcaBelles, Garnet and Gold Scholar Society, Marching Chiefs, Garnet Girls Competitive Cheerleading, FSU Pow Wow, FSU Majorettes, Hillel at FSU, FSU Student Foundation, InternatioNole, Student Alumni Association, Hispanic/Latino Student Union, Relay For Life, The Big Event at FSU, Por Colombia, and the Men's Soccer Club. All organizations are funded through the SGA and many put on events throughout the year. Students may create their own RSO if the current interest or concern is not addressed by the previously established entities.

==== Fitness and intramural sports ====
The Bobby E. Leach Student Recreation Center has three regulation-size basketball courts on the upper level with the third court being designated for other sports such as volleyball, table tennis, and badminton. The Leach Center is membership access available to FSU students, staff and alumni.

The Florida State University intramural sports program is designed to encourage fitness and wellness in students. Sports clubs include equestrian and sailing. The clubs compete against other intercollegiate club teams around the United States. Intramural sports include flag football, basketball, recreational soccer, volleyball, sand volleyball, softball, swimming, kickball, mini golf, team bowling, tennis, ultimate frisbee, wiffle ball, dodge ball, battleship, college pick em, innertube water polo, kan jam, spikeball, and wallyball.

==== Entertainment ====
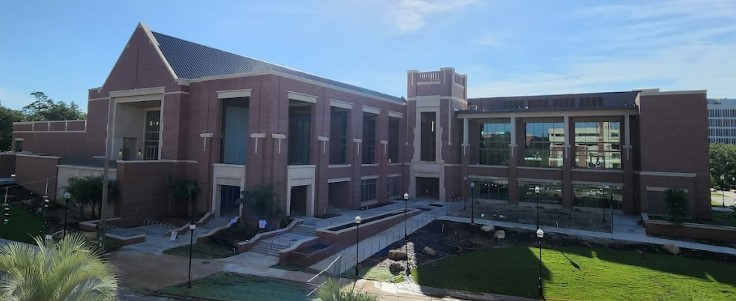
Student Union, opened 2022

Student life at Florida State is often centered around the FSU Student Union, located on the North side of campus. A student activities facility first opened at the Rowena Longmire Student-Alumnae building in 1940. The Student Union offers over 223,000 square feet of space for dining, activities and entertainment.

The Askew Student Life Center is home to the Student Life Cinema, a large movie theater run primarily by the student body. Films are free for students and generally fall into one of four categories: midnights, classics, new releases, and co-sponsorships. Students can attend weekly meetings where upcoming films are selected by students. FSU alumni, staff and the public may view movies for a nominal fee.

The Lakefront Park & Retreat Center Reservation is a 73-acre (300,000 m^{2}) lakeside recreational area located off campus on Lake Bradford in Tallahassee. This university facility (later called Camp Flastacowo) was founded in 1920 as a retreat for students when FSU was the state college for women between 1905 and 1947.

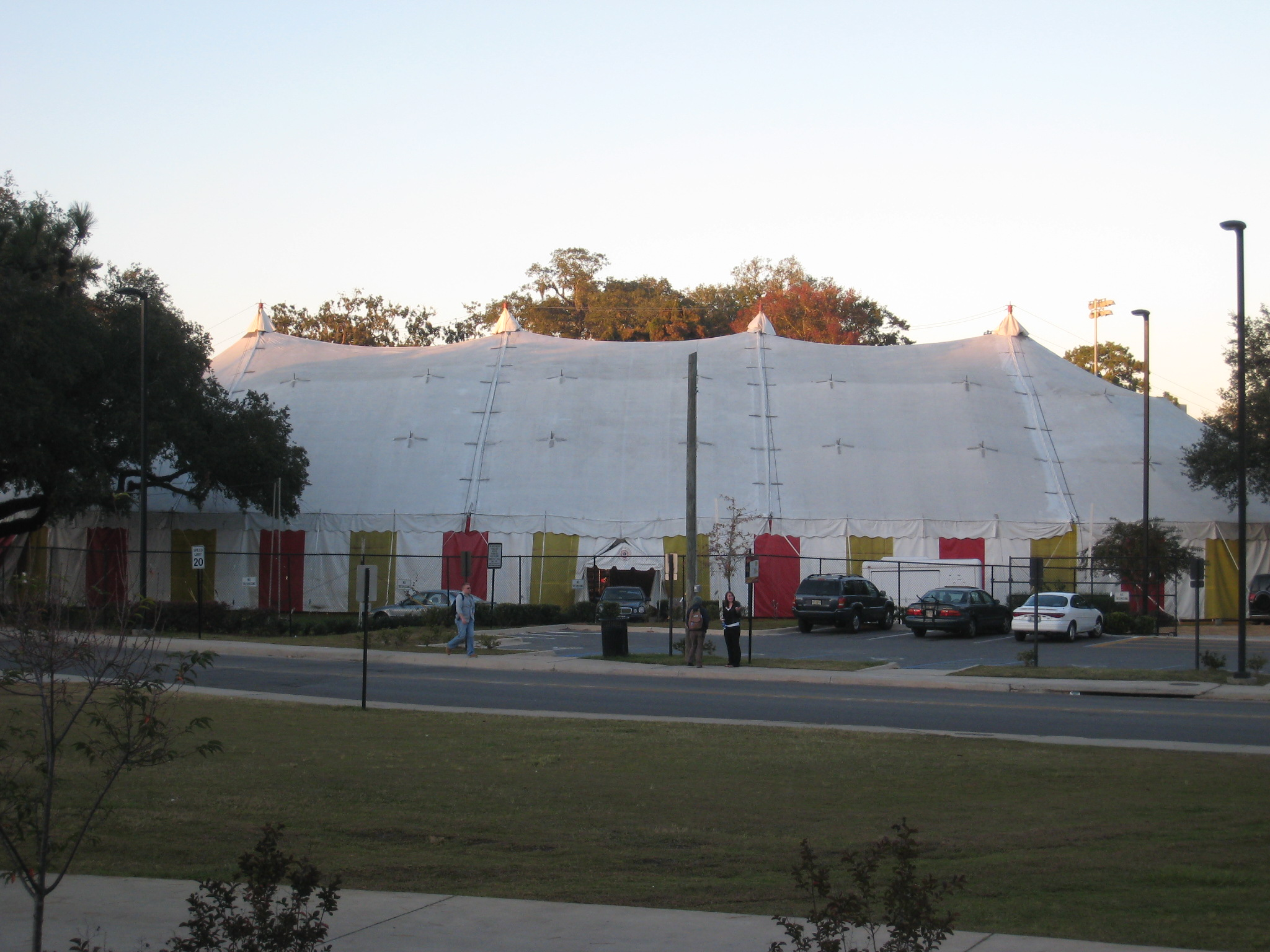
FSU Circus tent

The FSU Flying High Circus is one of two collegiate schools in the country that has a circus. Participants audition for roles and must be enrolled degree-seeking students of the university.

==== Greek life ====
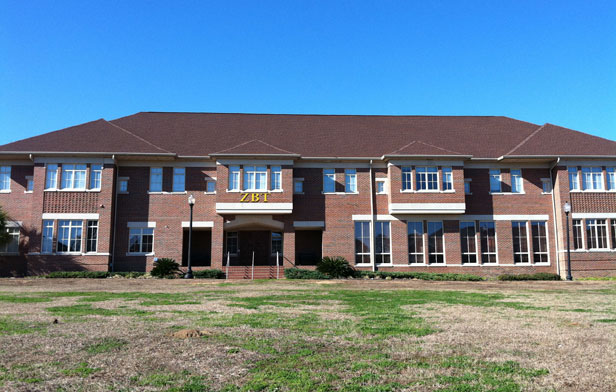
Zeta Beta Tau House

About 17% of undergraduate men are in a fraternity and 23% of undergraduate women are in a sorority. The Office of Greek Life at Florida State University encompasses the Interfraternity Council (IFC), Panhellenic Council (NPC), Multicultural Greek Council (MGC), and the National Pan-Hellenic Council (NPHC).

=== Reserve Officer Training Corps ===
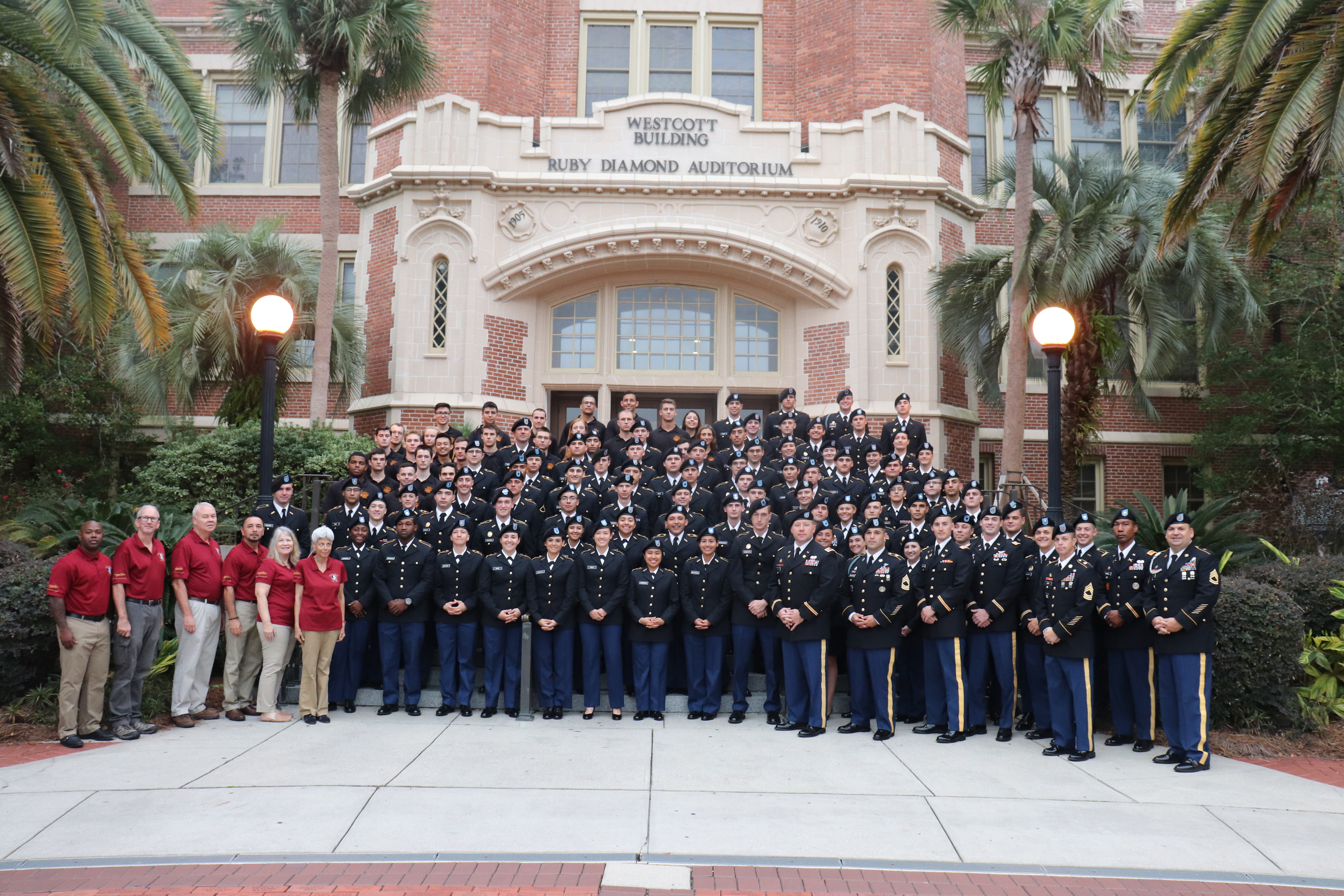
FSU Army ROTC members

Florida State University's Reserve Officer Training Corps is the military officer training and commissioning program at Florida State University. Dating back to Civil War days, the Army ROTC unit at Florida State University is one of four collegiate military units with permission to display a battle streamer, in recognition of the military service of student cadets during the Battle of Natural Bridge in 1865. The Reserve Officer Training Corps offers commissions for the United States Army. The Reserve Officer Training Corps at Florida State is located at the Harpe-Johnson Building. The Reserve Officer Training Corps at Florida State University offers training in the military sciences to students who desire to perform military service after they graduate. The Departments of the Army maintains a Reserve Officers Training Corps and has a full staff of active duty military personnel serving as instructor cadre or administrative support staff.

=== Campus and area transportation ===
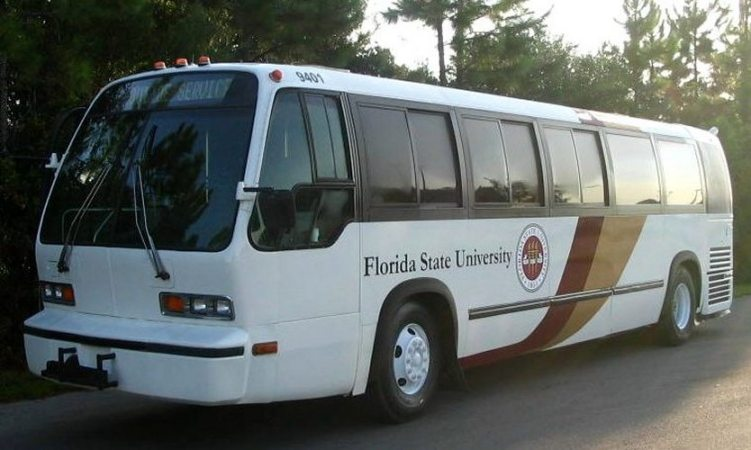
FSU Bus Service (circa 2006)

The FSU campus is served by eight bus routes of the Seminole Express Bus Service. FSU also provides other campus services, including Spirit Shuttle (during football games), Nole Cab, S.A.F.E. Connection, and Night Nole nighttime service.

=== University media ===
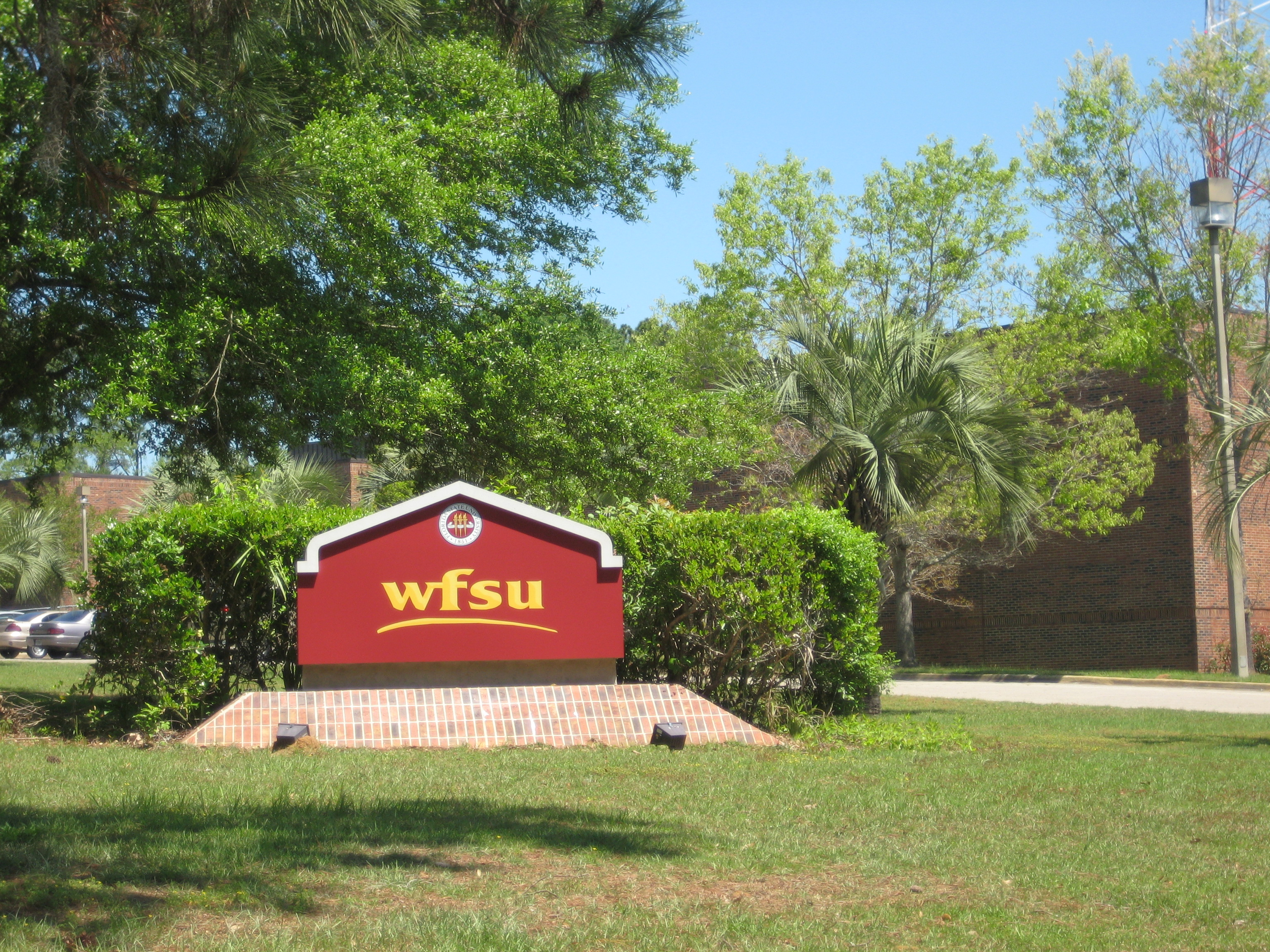
WFSU Public Broadcast Center

WFSU Public Media is affiliated with the Public Broadcasting Service (PBS) and National Public Radio (NPR), and FSU holds licenses. FSU operates two television stations, WFSU and WFSG-TV, and four FM-broadcast radio stations, WFSU-FM, WFSQ-FM, WFSW-FM and WFSL-FM including repeater broadcast stations in Apalachicola, Marianna, and Port St. Joe. WFSU Public Media also has cable and streaming delivery of the broadcast content.

FSU operates a fifth radio station, WVFS (V89, "The Voice," or "The Voice of Florida State"), as an on-campus instructional radio station affiliated with the FSU Student Government Association as well as the FSU College of Communication and Information and staffed by student and community volunteers. WVFS broadcasts diverse and spontaneous music as an alternative to commercial radio.

The campus newspaper, the FSView & Florida Flambeau, publishes weekly during the summer and semiweekly on Mondays and Thursdays during the school year following the academic calendar. The FSView & Florida Flambeau is owned by Gannett Co, Inc.

The English Department publishes a literary journal, The Southeast Review, founded in 1979 as Sundog.

== Athletics ==
Florida State Seminoles alternate athletic programs logo

The school's athletic teams are called the Seminoles, derived from the Seminole people. The name was chosen by students in 1947 and is officially sanctioned by the Seminole Tribe of Florida. The NCAA granted FSU permission to use the name Seminoles due to the coordination and blessing of the Seminole Tribe of Florida

Florida State's athletes participate in the NCAA's Division I (Bowl Subdivision for football) and in the Atlantic Coast Conference.

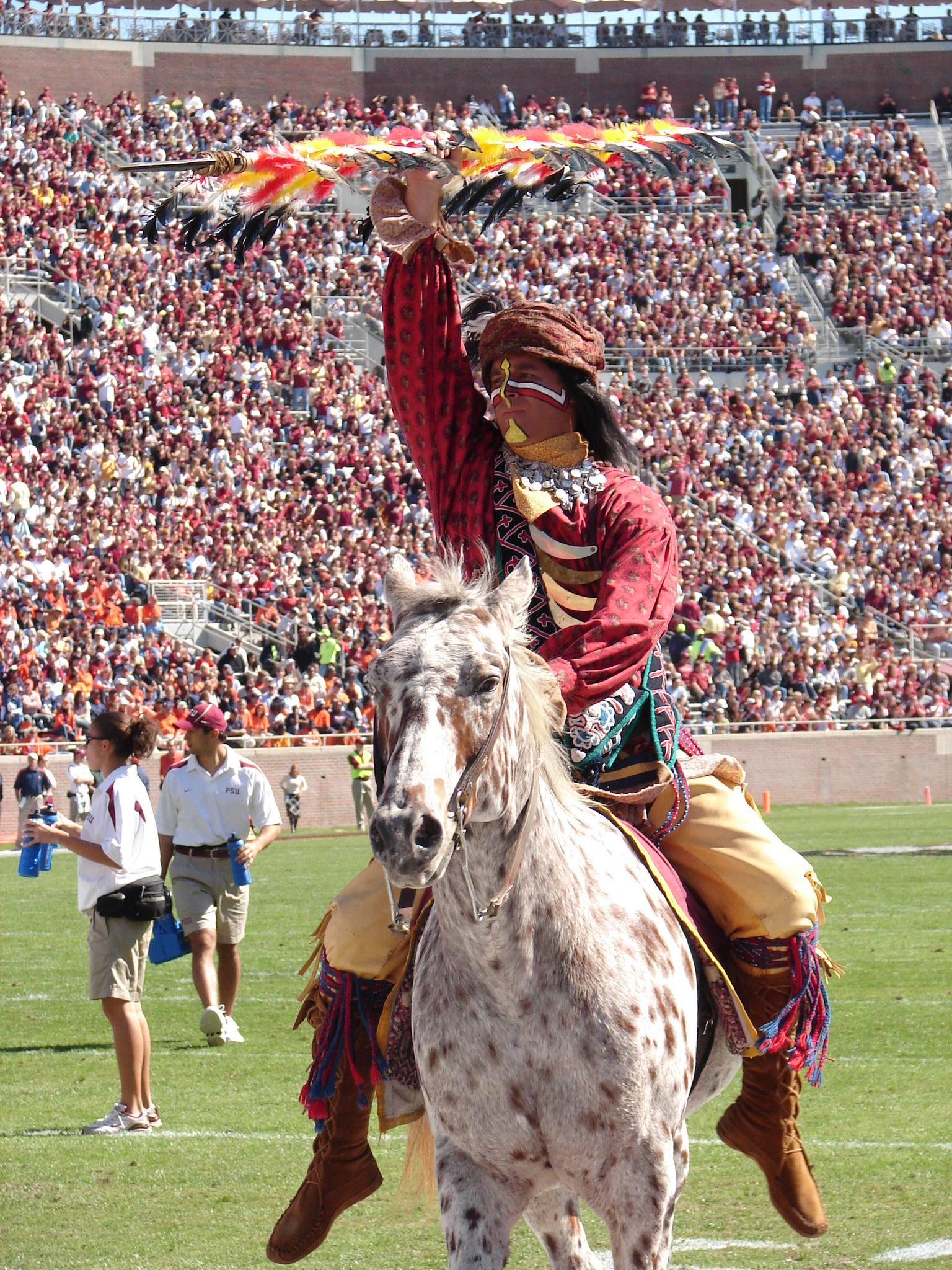
FSU's Chief Osceola on Renegade

Florida State University is known for its competitive athletics in both men's and women's sports competitions. The men's program consists of baseball, basketball, cross country running, football, golf, swimming, tennis, and track & field. The women's program consists of basketball, cross country running, golf, soccer, softball, swimming, tennis, track & field, and volleyball. FSU's Intercollegiate Club sports include bowling, crew, rugby, soccer and lacrosse.

There are two major stadiums and an arena in or around FSU's main campus: Doak Campbell Stadium for football, Dick Howser Stadium for men's baseball, and the Donald L. Tucker Center for men's and women's basketball. The Mike Long Track is the home of the national champion men's outdoor track and field team. H. Donald Loucks courts at the Speicher Tennis Center is the home of the FSU tennis team. By presidential directive the complex was named in honor of Lieutenant Commander Michael Scott Speicher, a graduate of Florida State University and the first American casualty during Operation Desert Storm. The Seminole Soccer Complex is home to women's soccer. The home record is 4,582 for the 2006 game versus the University of Florida. The FSU women's softball team plays at the Seminole Softball Complex; the field is named for JoAnne Graf.

=== Seminole baseball ===
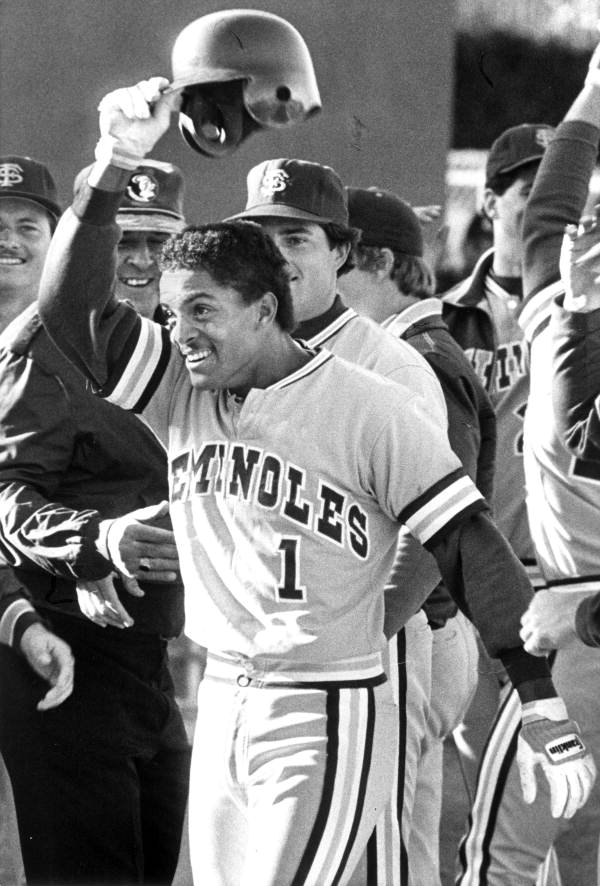
Seminoles baseball player Luis Alicea salutes the crowd during a game in 1986

Seminole baseball is one of the most successful collegiate baseball programs in the United States having been to 20 College World Series', and having appeared in the national championship final on three occasions. As of 2024, the Seminoles had the third-most college world series appearances.

=== Seminole football ===
The Florida State Seminoles football program has played in 49 bowl games, won three consensus national championships, sixteen Atlantic Coast Conference (ACC) championships, six ACC division titles, produced 218 All-Americans, 47 National Football League (NFL) first-round draft choices, and three Heisman Trophy winners. The Seminoles have achieved three undefeated seasons and finished ranked in the top five of the AP Poll for 14 straight years from 1987 through 2000.

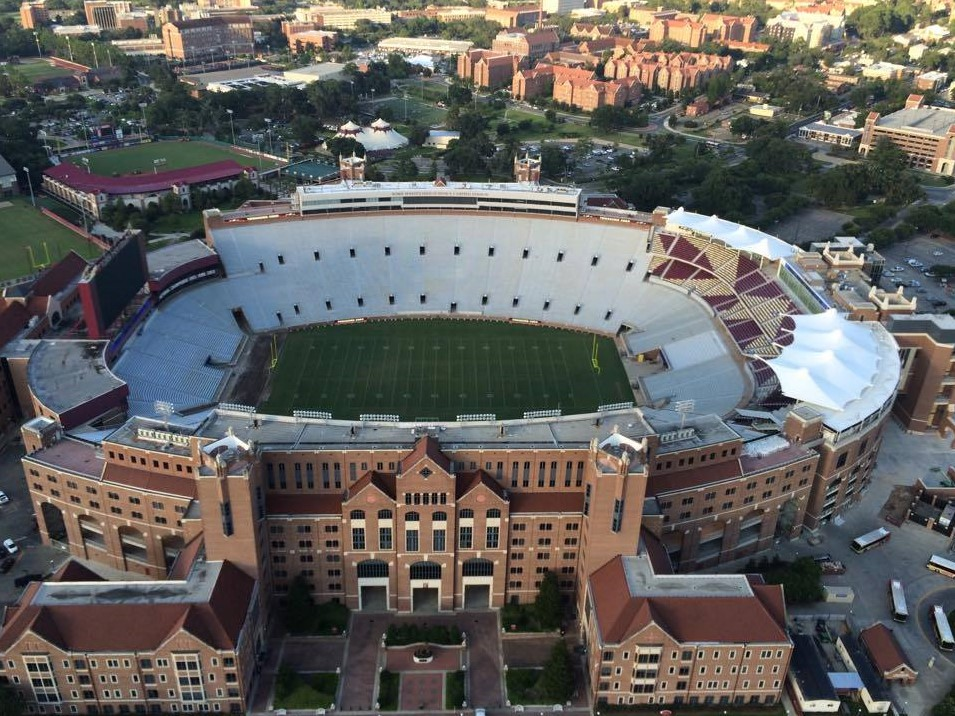
Aerial view - Doak Campbell Stadium (2017)

The Seminoles' home field is Bobby Bowden Field at Doak Campbell Stadium, which has a capacity of 79,560.

Florida State University fielded its first official varsity football team in the fall of 1902 until 1904, which were then known as "The Eleven". The team went (7–6–1) over the 1902–1904 seasons posting a record of (3–1) against their rivals from the Florida Agricultural College in Lake City. In 1904 the Florida State football team became the first ever state champions of Florida after beating both the Florida Agricultural College and Stetson University.

Under head coach Bobby Bowden, the Seminole football team became one of the nation's most competitive college football teams. The Seminoles played in five national championship games between 1993 and 2001 and won the championship in 1993 and 1999. The FSU football team was the most successful team in college football during the 1990s, boasting an 88% winning percentage. Bobby Bowden would retire with the record for most all-time career wins in Division I football. The 2013 Seminoles football team next won a national championship in 2013 under Jimbo Fisher.

=== Seminole track and field ===
The FSU men's Track & Field team won the Atlantic Coast Conference championship four times running, in addition to winning the NCAA National Championship three consecutive years. In 2006 Head Coach Bob Braman and Associate Head Coach Harlis Meaders helped lead individual champions in the 200 m (Walter Dix), the triple jump (Raqeef Curry), and the shot put (Garrett Johnson). Individual runners-up were Walter Dix in the 100 m, Ricardo Chambers in the 400 m, and Tom Lancashire in the 1500 m. Others scoring points in the National Championship were Michael Ray Garvin in the 200 m (8th), Andrew Lemoncello in the 3000 m steeplechase (4th), Raqeef Curry in the long jump (6th), and Garrett Johnson in the discus (5th). In 2007, FSU won its second straight men's Track & Field NCAA National Championship when Dix became the first person to hold the individual title in the 100 m and 200 m.

== Faculty ==
Florida State University currently employs 2,727 faculty members and over 3,920 staff. Florida State is represented by faculty serving in a number of renowned Academies, Voluntary Associations and Societies. Florida State was home to the first ETA10-G/8 supercomputer. Professor E. Imre Friedmann and researcher Roseli Friedmann demonstrated primitive life could survive in rocks, establishing the potential for life on other planets. Robert A. Holton, a professor of chemistry at Florida State, developed the first total synthesis of the anti-cancer drug paclitaxel, which had previously been obtainable only from the bark of the Pacific yew tree. Holton patented an improved process with an 80% yield. Florida State University earned more than $351 million in royalties through its patent on Taxol. Holton was later elected to the National Academy of Inventors.

== People ==
As of August 2023, Florida State University has over 400,000 alumni located in all fifty states and in many countries. Approximately thirty percent are under the age of thirty-five.

== See also ==
- Burning Spear Society
- Florida State University School
- List of colleges and universities in Florida
- Marching Chiefs
- Master Craftsman Studio
- National Center for Choreography
- The War Chant
- Landmarks and Monuments of Florida State University
