= List of buildings at Florida State University =

Florida State University is a foremost member in the State University System of Florida and has many notable buildings located in cities including Tallahassee, Panama City, and Sarasota. From the 1950s through the 80s, many buildings were designed with Brutalist and Modern styles; before that, they were predominantly Collegiate Gothic. There are over 300 buildings, 100 of which have classrooms.

Buildings at Florida State University
Bld#	Photo	Building Name	Style/ Architect	Year Built	Year Renov	Current Usage	Gross area	Bld code	Address
7400		Academic Health Center	Hospital	2026	NA	Healthcare	138,381 sq ft (12,856.0 m^{2})	ACH	1674 Nurses Drive
4090		Albert J. and Judith A. Dunlap Football Center; Indoor football	Jacobean Revival	2013	2025	Athletic Training		IPF	389 Stadium Dr
465		Alumni Center Facility	Jacobean Revival	2004	NA	Alumni Affairs	20,940 sq ft (1,945 m^{2})	ACF	1028 W Tennessee St
855		AME Building; Aeropropulsion, Mechatronics, and Energy	Jacobean Revival	2012	NA	Research	61,726 sq ft (5,734.5 m^{2})	AME	2003 Levy Ave
438		Arts Teaching Lab		1960	NA	Classrooms	6,675 sq ft (620.1 m^{2})	ATL	525 W Call St
260		Askew Student Life Center honoring Reubin Askew	Jacobean Revival	2000	NA	Student Services	60,944 sq ft (5,661.9 m^{2})	ASK	942 Learning Way
4062		Azalea Hall	Jacobean Revival	2017	NA	Student Housing	130,196 sq ft (12,095.6 m^{2})	AZL	824 W Jefferson St
4088		Bat House				Bat House	81 sq ft (7.5 m^{2})	BH1	505 W Pensacola Street
8		Bellamy Building; Raymond F Bellamy Building; College of Social Sciences	Brutalist	1967	NA	Classroom Office	15,790 sq ft (1,467 m^{2})	BEL	113 Collegiate Loop
39		Biology Unit 1	Brick Modern	1967	NA	Classroom Office	80,661 sq ft (7,493.7 m^{2})	BIO	89 Chieftan Way
9		Biomedical Research Facility		1991	NA	Research	58,147 sq ft (5,402.0 m^{2})	BRF	107 Chieftan Way
4433		Black Student Union		2018	NA	Research	7,248 sq ft (673.4 m^{2})	BSU	921 W Jefferson St
15		Broward Hall	Collegiate; Gothic	1917	1998	Student Housing	37,149 sq ft (3,451.3 m^{2})	BRW	668 University Way
14		Bryan Hall	Collegiate; Gothic	1908	1997	Student Housing	36,795 sq ft (3,418.4 m^{2})	BRY	182 Convocation Way
4014		Call Street Garage	Brutalist			Parking Garage	295,730 sq ft (27,474 m^{2})	PG4	504 West Call Street
4500		Carnaghi Arts Building; John R Carnaghi Arts Building	Jacobean Revival	1969	2022	Classroom; Studio	105,560 sq ft (9,807 m^{2})	CAB	2214 Belle Vue Way
55		Carothers Hall; Milton Carothers Hall	Brick Modern	1957	NA	Classroom; Office; Admin	68,221 sq ft (6,337.9 m^{2})	MCH	1021 Atomic Way
113		Carraway Building; F Wilson Carraway Sr Building	Brick Modern	1952	NA	Classroom Office	45,528 sq ft (4,229.7 m^{2})	CAR	60 N Woodward Ave
85		Cawthon Hall	Collegiate; Gothic	1949	1992	Student Housing	93,987 sq ft (8,731.7 m^{2})	CAW	119 Honors Way
443		Center for Couple and Family Therapy			2010	Office		MFC	540 Jefferson Street
2000		Challenger Learning Center	Modern	2001	NA	Research	39,169 sq ft (3,638.9 m^{2})	CLC	200 S Duval St
4008		Chemical Science Lab	Jacobean Revival	2008	NA	Laboratory	169,308 sq ft (15,729.2 m^{2})	CSL	102 Varsity Way
4033		Childcare and Early Learning		1950	NA		6,351 sq ft (590.0 m^{2})	CCD	612 S Copeland Street
625		Circus Tent		NA	NA	Student Activity	19,263 sq ft (1,789.6 m^{2})	625	269 Chieftan Way
4030		Coburn Wellness Center	Jacobean Revival	2012	NA	Student Health	176,828 sq ft (16,427.9 m^{2})	HWC	960 Learning Way
42		Collins Research Building honoring LeRoy Collins	Brick Modern	1959	NA	Laboratory	53,549 sq ft (4,974.9 m^{2})	NRB	1060 Atomic Way
3401		Commonwealth Building	Office Industrial	1982	NA	Research	38,823 sq ft (3,606.8 m^{2})	CW1	3000 Commonwealth Blvd
3402		Commonwealth Research Complex	Office Industrial	1985	NA	Research	19,383 sq ft (1,800.7 m^{2})	CW2	3200 Commonwealth Blvd
5		Criminology & Criminal Justice Building formerly Francis W. Eppes Hall	Collegiate; Gothic	1918	2012	Administration; Classroom; Office	28,752 sq ft (2,671.1 m^{2})	CRM	112 S Copeland St
4023		DeGraff Hall East	Jacobean Revival	2007	NA	Student Housing	85,751 sq ft (7,966.5 m^{2})	RH8	808 W Tennessee St
4024		DeGraff Hall West	Jacobean Revival	2007	NA	Student Housing	84,102 sq ft (7,813.3 m^{2})	RH9	810 W Tennessee St
4061		DeViney Hall	Jacobean Revival	2014	NA	Student Housing	102,996 sq ft (9,568.6 m^{2})	NDE	111 S Woodward Ave
2		Diffenbaugh Building; Guy Linton Diffenbaugh Bldg; College of Arts & Sciences	Collegiate; Gothic	1921	1950	Classroom Office	97,489 sq ft (9,057.0 m^{2})	DIF	625 University Way
20		Dirac Science Library honoring Paul Dirac	Brick Brutalist	1988	2015	Library	109,662 sq ft (10,187.9 m^{2})	DSL	110 N Woodward Ave
38		Dittmer Chemistry Lab honoring Karl Dittmer	Brick Brutalist	1967	NA	Laboratory	144,881 sq ft (13,459.9 m^{2})	DLC	95 Chieftan Way
100		Doak Campbell Stadium; Bobby Bowden Field at Doak S. Campbell Stadium	Jacobean Revival	1950	2000	Athletics	766,158 sq ft (71,178.4 m^{2})	CAM	411 Stadium Dr
4		Dodd Hall honoring William George Dodd	Collegiate Gothic	1923	1982	Library Classroom Office	54,338 sq ft (5,048.2 m^{2})	DOD	641 University Way
49		Dodd Lecture Hall	Jacobean Revival	1993	NA	Classroom Office	12,329 sq ft (1,145.4 m^{2})	DHA	646 W Jefferson St
4060		Dorman Hall	Jacobean Revival	2014	NA	Student Housing	107,128 sq ft (9,952.5 m^{2})	NDO	101 S Woodward Ave
4011		Dunlap Student Success Center	Jacobean Revival	2008	NA	Student Services	48,914 sq ft (4,544.3 m^{2})	DSC	100 S Woodward Ave
40		Duxbury Hall honoring Vivian M Duxbury	Brick Brutalist	1975	NA	Classroom Office	65,833 sq ft (6,116.1 m^{2})	SCN	98 Varsity Way
8004		East Field House; Rec SportsPlex				Sports Venue		IM4	3950 Tyson Rd
114		Engineering Lab Building	Brick Modern	1957	NA	Laboratory	9,476 sq ft (880.3 m^{2})	ELB	1033 Atomic Way
4010		EOAS Building; Earth Ocean & Atmospheric Science	Jacobean Revival	2019	NA	Classroom Office	143,390 sq ft (13,321 m^{2})	EOA	1011 Academic Way
3801		Facility for Arts Research	Jacobean Revival	2002	NA	Research	26,498 sq ft (2,461.7 m^{2})	FAR	3216 Sessions Rd
577		FAMU-FSU Engineering Bldg A	Brick Brutalist	1998	NA	Classroom Office	126,641 sq ft (11,765.3 m^{2})	CE1	2525 Pottsdamer St
527		FAMU-FSU Engineering Bldg B	Brick Brutalist	1986	NA	Classroom Office	98,520 sq ft (9,153 m^{2})	CE2	2525 Pottsdamer St
7		Fine Arts Building	Brick Brutalist	1969	NA	Classroom Office	125,611 sq ft (11,669.6 m^{2})	FAB	530 W Call St
37		Fisher Lecture Hall honoring James Robert Fisher	Brick Modern	1969	NA	Classroom Office	9,844 sq ft (914.5 m^{2})	FLH	111 N Woodward Ave
814		Frank Shaw Building honoring Frank Shaw	Jacobean Revival	1996	NA	Research	42,111 sq ft (3,912.2 m^{2})	FSB	2031 E Paul Dirac Dr
2020		FSU Foundation Building	Office Midrise	1984	NA	Administration	28,352 sq ft (2,634.0 m^{2})	TFB	325 W College Ave
7401		FSU Health Building		2002	NA	Clinic	35,743 sq ft (3,320.6 m^{2})	PRC	2390 Phillips Rd
813		Fuqua Complex Johnson Bldg; Research Building	Modern	1996	NA	Research	41,807 sq ft (3,884.0 m^{2})	RMJ	2035 E Paul Dirac Dr
805		Fuqua Complex Morgan Bldg; Research Building	Modern	1987	NA	Research	36,498 sq ft (3,390.8 m^{2})	HMB	2035 E Paul Dirac Dr
804		Fuqua Complex Sliger Bldg; Research	Modern	1987	NA	Classroom Office	40,521 sq ft (3,764.5 m^{2})	BFS	2035 E Paul Dirac Dr
16		Gilchrist Hall	Collegiate; Gothic	1925	1998	Student Housing	65,762 sq ft (6,109.5 m^{2})	GIL	702 University Way
4031		Global & Multicultural Engagement Building	Jacobean Revival	2009	NA	Outreach	44,000 sq ft (4,100 m^{2})	CGE	110 S Woodward Ave
121		Harpe-Johnson Building; Military Science ROTC	Brick Modern	1953	NA	Classroom Office	20,595 sq ft (1,913.3 m^{2})	MIL	103 Varsity Way
117		Haskin Circus Complex		1968	NA	Student Activity	6,072 sq ft (564.1 m^{2})	CIR	269 Chieftan Way
294		Hecht House	Brick Modern	1961	NA	Student	16,970 sq ft (1,577 m^{2})	HEC	634 W Call St
35		Hoffman Teaching Lab honoring Katherine B Hoffman	Brutalist	1969	NA	Laboratory	72,598 sq ft (6,744.6 m^{2})	HTL	101 Chieftan Way
4029		Honors Scholars & Fellows; Programs	Jacobean Revival	2013	NA	Student Activity	40,536 sq ft (3,765.9 m^{2})	HSF	127 Honors Way
54		Housewright Music Bldg; Wiley L Housewright Music Building; Allen Music Library	Jacobean Revival	2009	NA	Library Classroom Office	107,320 sq ft (9,970 m^{2})	HMU	122 N Copeland St
115		Howser Stadium honoring Mike Martin and Dick Howser	Jacobean Revival	1975	??	Athletics	75,788 sq ft (7,040.9 m^{2})	HBS	270 Chieftan Way
4009		Huge Classroom Building	Jacobean Revival	2006	NA	Classroom Office	106,533 sq ft (9,897.2 m^{2})	HCB	989 Learning Way
870		IRCB Building; Interdisciplinary Research and Commercialization Building	Jacobean Revival	2024	NA	Research	125,334 sq ft (11,643.9 m^{2})	IRC	2001 Levy Ave
890		IGNITE Tallahassee	Modern	2025	NA	Business Incubator	40,000 sq ft (3,700 m^{2})	IGN	1729 W Paul Dirac Dr
12		Jennie Murphree Hall	Collegiate; Gothic	1921	1993	Student Housing	74,958 sq ft (6,963.8 m^{2})	JMH	126 Convocation Way
17		Johnston Building honoring William H. Johnston; Department of Art History	Collegiate; Gothic	1913	2006 2011	Library Classroom Office	180,062 sq ft (16,728.3 m^{2})	WJB	143 Honors Way
146		Kasha Laboratory honoring Michael Kasha	Brick Modern	1963	NA	Laboratory	50,802 sq ft (4,719.7 m^{2})	KLB	91 Chieftan Way
41		Keen Building honoring James Velma Keen	Brick Modern	1965	NA	Classroom Office	78,685 sq ft (7,310.1 m^{2})	KEN	77 Chieftan Way
6		Kellogg Research Building honoring Winthrop N Kellogg	Brick Modern	1965	NA	Classroom Office	47,161 sq ft (4,381.4 m^{2})	KRB	108 S Copeland St
4007		King Life Sciences Bldg honoring James E "Jim" King Jr	Jacobean Revival	2008	NA	Classroom Office	181,078 sq ft (16,822.7 m^{2})	KIN	319 Stadium Dr
89		Kuersteiner Music Building	Brick Modern	1950	NA	Classroom Office	91,889 sq ft (8,536.8 m^{2})	KMU	114 N Copeland St
470		Lab Theatre Building A		1980	1987		5,512 sq ft (512.1 m^{2})	TLA	502 S Copeland Street
471		Lab Theatre Building B					2,914 sq ft (270.7 m^{2})	TLB	502 S Copeland Street
74		Landis Hall	Collegiate; Gothic	1939	2006	Student Housing	106,822 sq ft (9,924.1 m^{2})	LAN	714 University Way
4040		Law Advocacy Center; Law School		1990	NA	Classroom Office	55,019 sq ft (5,111.4 m^{2})	LAC	301 S ML King Jr Blvd
205		Law Ausley House; Village Green Ausley		1860	??	Classroom Office	3,665 sq ft (340.5 m^{2})	VG4	310 S ML King Jr Blvd
32		Law B.K. Roberts Hall; College of Law	Brutalist	1971	NA	Library Classroom Office	72,869 sq ft (6,769.8 m^{2})	LAW	425 W Jefferson St
203		Law Caldwell House; Village Green Caldwell		1855	??	Classroom Office	5,185 sq ft (481.7 m^{2})	VG2	312 S ML King Jr Blvd
202		Law Cawthon House; Village Green Hobby-Harrison		1834	??	Classroom Office	2,330 sq ft (216 m^{2})	VG1	302 S ML King Jr Blvd
204		Law Damon House; Village Green Damon		1836	??	Classroom Office	3,678 sq ft (341.7 m^{2})	VG3	304 S ML King Jr Blvd
47		Law Research Center; College of Law	Brutalist	1983	NA	Library	56,891 sq ft (5,285.3 m^{2})	LLB	425 W Jefferson St
48		Law Rotunda; College of Law		1989	NA	Classroom	20,273 sq ft (1,883.4 m^{2})	LSR	425 W Jefferson St
26		Leach Center		1991	NA	Student Activity	140,990 sq ft (13,098 m^{2})	SRC	118 Varsity Way
4540		Legacy Hall; College of Business	Jacobean Revival	2025	NA	Classroom Auditorium Office	218,392 sq ft (20,289.3 m^{2})	COB	402 W Gaines St
72		Longmire Student Alumni Building honoring Rowena Longmire	Collegiate Gothic	1938	1969	Alumni Affairs	39,419 sq ft (3,662.1 m^{2})	LON	125 Convocation Way
116		Love Building; James J Love Building	Brick Modern	1961	2021	Classroom Office	100,234 sq ft (9,312.0 m^{2})	LOV	1017 Academic Way
264		Mabry Building	Collegiate Gothic	1947	NA	Maintenance	1,682 sq ft (156.3 m^{2})	M40	1151 Hull Dr
4063		Magnolia Hall	Jacobean Revival	2017	NA	Student Housing	112,637 sq ft (10,464.3 m^{2})	MGN	802 University Way
3403		Maryland Building		2000	NA	Research	33,914 sq ft (3,150.7 m^{2})	CW3	2139 Maryland Cir
478		Master Craftsman Studio		1972	NA	Workshop	5,393 sq ft (501.0 m^{2})	WH1	905 W Gaines St
854		Materials Research Building	Jacobean Revival	2008	NA	Research	50,238 sq ft (4,667.3 m^{2})	MRB	2005 Levy Ave
75		McCollum Hall	Brutalist	1975	NA	Student Housing	87,574 sq ft (8,135.9 m^{2})	EMH	1165 Academic Way
91		McIntosh Track & Field Building		2008	NA	Research	21,488 sq ft (1,996.3 m^{2})	TRK	1104 Spirit Way
4001		Med Thrasher Building; College of Medicine honoring John E. Thrasher	Jacobean Revival	2004	NA	Research	156,631 sq ft (14,551.5 m^{2})	MSB	1115 W Call St
4003		Med Peaden Auditorium; College of Medicine	Jacobean Revival	2005	NA	Auditorium	8,164 sq ft (758.5 m^{2})	MSA	1115 W Call St
4002		Medical Research Building; College of Medicine	Jacobean Revival	2005	NA	Research	147,789 sq ft (13,730.0 m^{2})	MSR	1115 W Call St
8052		Medical Primary Health; College of Medicine; Daniel J. Van Durme, M.D. Building	Modern	2019	NA	Research	9,986 sq ft (927.7 m^{2})	IHC	2911 Roberts Ave
77		Mendenhall Building A	Brutalist	1979	NA	Classroom Office	84,663 sq ft (7,865.5 m^{2})	MMA	969 Learning Way
78		Mendenhall Building B	Brutalist	1979	NA	Classroom Office	17,523 sq ft (1,627.9 m^{2})	MMB	965 Learning Way
25		Montgomery Hall formerly Montgomery Gym honoring Kate Montgomery	Collegiate Gothic	1929	2004	Classroom Office	94,628 sq ft (8,791.2 m^{2})	MON	130 Collegiate Loop
195		Moore Auditorium	Brick Brutalist	1964	2022	Auditorium	12,536 sq ft (1,164.6 m^{2})	MOR	83 N Woodward Ave
2021		Moran Building honoring Jim Moran		1969	2018	Research	23,852 sq ft (2,215.9 m^{2})	JMB	111 S Monroe St
8008		Morcom Aquatics Center	Jacobean Revival	2008	2009	Student Activity	8,372 sq ft (777.8 m^{2})	MAC	2560 Pottsdamer St
8010		Multi-Purpose Building; Educational Facility	Jacobean Revival	2011	NA	Education Facility	47,238 sq ft (4,388.6 m^{2})	MEF	2566 Pottsdamer St
22		National High Magnetic Lab		1988	NA	Laboratory	201,654 sq ft (18,734.3 m^{2})	MAG	1800 E Paul Dirac Dr
69		NHMFL DC Magnet Building; National High Magnetic Field Laboratory		1992	NA	Laboratory	98,962 sq ft (9,193.9 m^{2})	DCM	1800 E Paul Dirac Dr
269		NHMFL NMR Building; Nuclear Magnetic Resonance		1992	NA	Laboratory	29,941 sq ft (2,781.6 m^{2})	NMR	1800 E Paul Dirac Dr
380		NW Regional Data Center		1972	NA	Computer Services	23,952 sq ft (2,225.2 m^{2})	NWR	2048 E Paul Dirac Dr
86		Pearl Tyner Welcome Center formerly the McIntosh House	Greek Revival	1898	2007	Alumni Affairs	4,739 sq ft (440.3 m^{2})	AWC	1030 W Tennessee St
57		Pepper Building honoring Claude Pepper	Jacobean Revival	1997	NA	Library Research	43,121 sq ft (4,006.1 m^{2})	PCB	636 W Call St
4012		President's House	Greek Revival; Aaron Dailey	2007	NA	Residence	16,092 sq ft (1,495.0 m^{2})	PNR	1000 W Tennessee St
4005		Psychology Auditorium; Department of Psychology	Jacobean Revival	2006	NA	Auditorium	7,539 sq ft (700.4 m^{2})	PDA	1107 W Call St
4004		Psychology Building; Department of Psychology	Jacobean Revival	2008	NA	Classroom Office	179,408 sq ft (16,667.5 m^{2})	PDB	1107 W Call St
495		Ragans Hall 1 (A)	Jacobean Revival	2003	NA	Student Housing	52,515 sq ft (4,878.8 m^{2})	RH1	923 Learning Way
496		Ragans Hall 2 (B)	Jacobean Revival	2003	NA	Student Housing	50,362 sq ft (4,678.8 m^{2})	RH2	921 Learning Way
497		Ragans Hall 3 (C)	Jacobean Revival	2003	NA	Student Housing	51,462 sq ft (4,781.0 m^{2})	RH3	930 W Jefferson St
498		Ragans Hall 4 (D)	Jacobean Revival	2003	NA	Student Housing	52,512 sq ft (4,878.5 m^{2})	RH4	916 W Jefferson St
824		Research Foundation Bldg A	Jacobean Revival	2003	NA	Research	84,834 sq ft (7,881.3 m^{2})	RF1	2000 Levy Ave
825		Research Foundation Bldg B	Jacobean Revival	2003	NA	Research	85,280 sq ft (7,923 m^{2})	RF2	2010 Levy Ave
13		Reynolds Hall	Collegiate Gothic	1913	1996 2009	Student Housing	71,647 sq ft (6,656.2 m^{2})	REY	134 Convocation Way
45		Richards Building	Brutalist	1977	NA	Classroom Office	26,060 sq ft (2,421 m^{2})	UPL	1055 Atomic Way
11		Roderick Shaw Building honoring Roderick K Shaw; Moran Coll. Entrepreneurship	Brutalist	1972	NA	Multi	24,645 sq ft (2,289.6 m^{2})	RSB	644 W Call St
36		Rogers Building (OSB) honoring Grover Lee Rogers	Brutalist	1969	NA	Classroom Office	54,790 sq ft (5,090 m^{2})	OSB	117 N Woodward Ave
44		Rogers Hall	Brutalist	1965	2009	Student Housing	66,127 sq ft (6,143.4 m^{2})	ROG	1147 Academic Way
23		Rovetta Building A honoring Charles A Rovetta	Brutalist	1983	NA	Classroom Office	67,518 sq ft (6,272.6 m^{2})	RBA	821 Academic Way
52		Rovetta Building B Charles A Rovetta Building	Brutalist	1957	NA	Classroom Office	74,705 sq ft (6,940.3 m^{2})	RBB	821 Academic Way
46		Salley Hall	Brick Modern	1963	2009	Student Housing	125,176 sq ft (11,629.2 m^{2})	SAL	1106 W Call St
135		Sandels Building honoring Margaret R Sandels; College of Human Sciences	Brick Modern	1956	NA	Classroom Office	69,623 sq ft (6,468.2 m^{2})	SAN	120 Convocation Way
488		Seminole Cafe				Dining	19,055 sq ft (1,770.3 m^{2})	WDF	1110 W Call Street
8012		Seminole Lacrosse Complex Clubhouse		2026	NA	Athletics		WLC	2565 Pottsdamer St
8013		Seminole Lacrosse Complex Press Box		2026	NA	Athletics		WLP	2565 Pottsdamer St
19		Shores Building	Brutalist	1978	NA	Registrar IT Dining	56,003 sq ft (5,202.8 m^{2})	LSB	142 Collegiate Loop
4006		Spirit Way Garage	Brutalist			Parking Garage		PG3	1122 Spirit Way
4025		St. Augustine Street Garage	Brutalist			Parking Garage	279,863 sq ft (26,000.1 m^{2})	PG5	501 S Copeland St
945		Stadium Place - Training Center				Athletivcs	11,000 sq ft (1,000 m^{2})	STP	493 Stadium Drive
394		Stavros Center; Gus A. Stavros Center				Classroom	5,507 sq ft (511.6 m^{2})	SEC	250 S Woodward Avenue
50		Stone Building honoring Mode L Stone	Brutalist	1978	NA	Classroom Office	126,189 sq ft (11,723.3 m^{2})	STB	1114 W Call St
134		Strozier Library honoring Robert Strozier	Brick Modern	1956	??	Library	229,453 sq ft (21,316.9 m^{2})	LIB	116 Honors Way
4018		Student Union replacing Oglesby Student Union	Jacobean; Lewis + Whitlock	2022	NA	Student Activity	275,000 sq ft (25,500 m^{2})	NSU	75 N Woodward Ave
76		Tanner Hall honoring William A Tanner	Collegiate Gothic	1909	2009	Classroom Office	26,276 sq ft (2,441.1 m^{2})	PSF	830 W Jefferson St
860		Technology Services Building		1989	NA	Support	80,234 sq ft (7,454.0 m^{2})	TSB	1721 W Paul Dirac Dr
28		Thagard Health Center Building honoring Norman Thagard	Brutalist	1966	??	Classroom Office	44,919 sq ft (4,173.1 m^{2})	THC	109 Collegiate Loop
436		Theatre Fine Arts Annex	Brutalist	1978	NA	Classroom Office	15,805 sq ft (1,468.3 m^{2})	FAA	602 W Call St
4022		Traditions Hall	Jacobean Revival	2012	NA	Student Housing	125,708 sq ft (11,678.7 m^{2})	RH7	945 Learning Way
378		Traditions Way Garage	Brutalist			Parking Garage		PG2	860 Traditions Way
546		Tucker Civic Center honoring Donald L. Tucker		1991	2009	Event Venue	487,359 sq ft (45,277.1 m^{2})	CIV	505 W Pensacola St
132		Tully Gym honoring Robert Henry Tully	Brick Modern	1956	??	Athletics	91,893 sq ft (8,537.1 m^{2})	TUL	139 Chieftan Way
10		Turnbull Conference Center honoring Augustus B. Turnbull III		2007	NA	Conference	73,236 sq ft (6,803.8 m^{2})	TCC	555 W Pensacola St
223		University Center A T.K. Wetherell Building	Jacobean Revival; Barnett, Fronczak, Barlowe & Shuler	1994	NA	Administration Classroom Office	252,048 sq ft (23,416.0 m^{2})	UCA	282 Champions Way
224		University Center B	Jacobean Revival; Barnett, Fronczak, Barlowe & Shuler	1997	NA	Classroom Office	83,457 sq ft (7,753.4 m^{2})	UCB	288 Champions Way
225		University Center C	Jacobean Revival; Barnett, Fronczak, Barlowe & Shuler	1997	NA	Classroom Office	262,334 sq ft (24,371.6 m^{2})	UCC	296 Champions Way
226		University Center D Coyle Moore Athletic Cntr	Jacobean Revival; Barnett, Fronczak, Barlowe & Shuler	2002	NA	Athletics	205,012 sq ft (19,046.2 m^{2})	UCD	403 Stadium Dr
4041		Warren Building	Brutalist	1974	2012	Classroom Office	36,969 sq ft (3,434.5 m^{2})	CC1	201 W Bloxham St
4501		Waste Management & Recycling				Waste Management		RC1	1238 Crate Drive
1		Westcott Building; James D Westcott Jr Memorial Building	Collegiate; Gothic; William Augustus Edwards	1909	1973	Administration Offices; Auditorium	155,325 sq ft (14,430.2 m^{2})	WES	222 S Copeland St
4028		West Pensacola Street Garage	Brutalist	2012	NA	Parking Garage		PG6	410 Walker St
4020		Wildwood Hall 1	Jacobean Revival	2007	NA	Student Housing	80,257 sq ft (7,456.1 m^{2})	RH5	938 W Jefferson St
4021		Wildwood Hall 2	Jacobean Revival	2007	NA	Student Housing	80,105 sq ft (7,442.0 m^{2})	RH6	202 Varsity Dr
3		Williams Building; Arthur Williams History Bldg; Augusta Conradi Theatre	Collegiate; Gothic	1926	2001	Classroom Office	70,962 sq ft (6,592.6 m^{2})	WMS	631 University Way
4042		Winchester Building	Brutalist	1972	NA	Classroom Office	21,518 sq ft (1,999.1 m^{2})	CC2	305 Blount St
70		Woodward Garage	Brutalist	1994	NA	Parking Garage	304,921 sq ft (28,328.1 m^{2})	PG1	104 N Woodward Ave

== Former buildings ==
Former Buildings at Florida State University
Bld#	Photo	Building Name	Style/ Architect	Year Built	Year Demo'd	Last Usage	Gross area	Bld code	Address
194		Activities Building		1964	2018	Student Activity	20,940 sq ft (1,945 m^{2})	ACT	1028 W Tennessee St
193		Alumni Memorial Village		1960	2015	Student Residence	20,940 sq ft (1,945 m^{2})	AMV	157 Herlong Dr
		Burt Reynolds Hall		1968	2025	Athlete Housing	36,480 sq ft (3,389 m^{2})		215 Hayden Rd
193		College Hall	James Gamble Rogers II	1956	2013	Student Activity	20,940 sq ft (1,945 m^{2})	COL	1028 W Tennessee St
193		Conradi Building	James Gamble Rogers II	1956	2013	Student Activity	20,940 sq ft (1,945 m^{2})	CON	1028 W Tennessee St
193		Crenshaw Lanes		1964	2018	Student Activity	20,940 sq ft (1,945 m^{2})	CRB	1028 W Tennessee St
196		Davis Building		1964	2018	Food Service	60,936 sq ft (5,661.1 m^{2})	DAV	79 W Woodward Ave
196		Degraff Hall Original	Robert Fitch Smith	1959	2015	Student Residence	20,940 sq ft (1,945 m^{2})	DEG	808 W Tennessee St
196		DeViney Hall Original	Guy Fulton	1952	2015	Student Residence	20,940 sq ft (1,945 m^{2})	DEV	111 S Woodward Ave
196		Dorman Hall Original		1959	2015	Student Residence	20,940 sq ft (1,945 m^{2})	DOR	101 S Woodward Ave
196		Gunter Building	Guy Fulton	1957	2015	Geology	20,940 sq ft (1,945 m^{2})	GUN	903 Tennessee Street
196		Infirmary	Guy Fulton	1919	2012	Student Medical	20,940 sq ft (1,945 m^{2})	INF	127 Honors Way
195		Kellum Hall	Russell Pancoast	1954	2016	Student Residence	20,940 sq ft (1,945 m^{2})	OGC	1028 W Tennessee St
6020		Killearn Center Bldg A	Office Midrise	2000	2026	Classroom Office	20,000 sq ft (1,900 m^{2})	AI1	2312 Killearn Center Blvd
195		Magnolia Hall Original	Russell Pancoast	1944	1979	Student Residence	20,940 sq ft (1,945 m^{2})	OGC	1028 W Tennessee St
195		Oglesby Student Union	Russell Pancoast	1952	2018	Student Activity	20,940 sq ft (1,945 m^{2})	OGC	1028 W Tennessee St
199		Post Office Building		1954	2018	Student Activity	20,940 sq ft (1,945 m^{2})	UPO	1028 W Tennessee St
195		Smith Hall Original	Bail, Horton & Assoc	1953	2017	Student Residence	20,940 sq ft (1,945 m^{2})	OGC	1028 W Tennessee St a
51		Turner Building		1988	2018	Student Activity	22,523 sq ft (2,092.5 m^{2})	TUR	75 N Woodward Ave

- College Hall at West Florida Seminary

== Building details ==
=== Reynolds Hall ===
Named in honor of America actor Burt Reynolds, the Reynolds Hall served as an athletic dorm from 1987 to 1995. It was demolished in September 2025 to become a parking lot.

== See also ==
- Florida State University
- Southwest Campus of Florida State University
- Florida State University student housing
- Innovation Park
