= Florida State University Lakefront Park =

Coordinates: 30°24′02″N 84°20′12″W

Park entrance

The Florida State University Lakefront Park & Retreat Center, formerly known as the FSU Reservation, is located on Lake Bradford near the FSU Southwest Campus just outside of Tallahassee, Florida. The facility is a recreation area open to Florida State University students, faculty and staff, and community members. It is the only public access to Lake Bradford, as other access points are on private property.

In total the FSU Lakefront Park & Retreat Center is 73 acres (300,000 m^{2}). Florida State students typically enjoy kayaking, canoeing, and play beach volleyball at this facility. Students that are currently attending Florida State University are admitted free into the FSU Lakefront Park with the proper identification. Watercraft rentals are free for students of Florida State University and available to the public for a fee.

The FSU Lakefront Park & Retreat Center is home to two outdoor adventure programs, Outdoor Pursuits and FSU Challenge. Outdoor Pursuits is an outdoor adventure program that takes trips across the southeast. The program is available to both students and community members for a fee. Trips include hiking, skiing, paddling, yoga, and more. FSU Challenge is a team building program, often facilitated on the high ropes course at the FSU Lakefront Park.

The FSU Lakefront Park & Retreat Center is owned and operated by Florida State University Campus Recreation.
