= List of Pi Tau Sigma chapters =

Pi Tau Sigma is an international honor society for mechanical engineering. It was established in 1915 at the University of Illinois. In the following chapter list, active chapters are indicated in bold and inactive chapters and institutions are in italics.

Chapter	Charter date	Institution	Location	Status	Ref.
**Illinois Alpha**	March 16, 1915	University of Illinois Urbana-Champaign	Urbana, Illinois	Active	
**Wisconsin Alpha**	March 12, 1916	University of Wisconsin–Madison	Madison, Wisconsin	Active	(Note: Chapter formed from a local honorary established on November 15, 1915.)
**Purdue Beta**	May 13, 1922	Purdue University	West Lafayette, Indiana	Active	
**Minnesota Gamma**	May 16, 1922	University of Minnesota	Minneapolis, Minnesota	Active	
Illinois Tech Delta	December 22, 1924	Illinois Institute of Technology	Chicago, Illinois	Inactive	
**Missouri Epsilon**	May 24, 1925	University of Missouri	Columbia, Missouri	Active	
**Penn State Zeta**	December 11, 1925	Pennsylvania State University	University Park, Pennsylvania	Active	
**Cincinnati Eta**	May 22, 1926	University of Cincinnati	Cincinnati, Ohio	Active	
**Lehigh Theta**	December 5, 1927	Lehigh University	Bethlehem, Pennsylvania	Active	
**Carnegie Iota**	May 20, 1930	Carnegie Mellon University	Pittsburgh, Pennsylvania	Active	
**Texas Kappa**	April 18, 1931	University of Texas at Austin	Austin, Texas	Active	
**Oklahoma State Lambda**	April 20, 1931	Oklahoma State University	Stillwater, Oklahoma	Active	
**Colorado Mu**	May 21, 1932	University of Colorado Boulder	Boulder, Colorado	Active	
**Cornell Pi Tau**	November 29, 1932	Cornell University	Ithaca, New York	Active	
**Georgia Tech Nu**	November 29, 1932	Georgia Tech	Atlanta, Georgia	Active	
**Drexel Xi**	June 7, 1933	Drexel University	Philadelphia, Pennsylvania	Active	
**Iowa Omicron**	November 15, 1935	University of Iowa	Iowa City, Iowa	Active	
**Kansas Psi**	November 15, 1935	University of Kansas	Lawrence, Kansas	Active	
**Nebraska Pi**	December 10, 1938	University of Nebraska–Lincoln	Lincoln, Nebraska	Active	
**Kansas State Rho**	May 20, 1939	Kansas State University	Manhattan, Kansas	Active	
**Oklahoma Sigma**	April 12, 1940	University of Oklahoma	Norman, Oklahoma	Active	
**Pittsburgh Tau**	April 22, 1940	University of Pittsburgh	Pittsburgh, Pennsylvania	Active	
**Virginia Tech Upsilon**	April 24, 1940	Virginia Tech	Blacksburg, Virginia	Active	
**Rensselaer Phi**	April 26, 1940	Rensselaer Polytechnic Institute	Troy, New York	Active	
**Auburn Chi**	December 7, 1940	Auburn University	Auburn, Alabama	Active	
**Detroit Pi Eta**	December 7, 1940	University of Detroit Mercy	Detroit, Michigan	Active	
**Massachusetts Phi Theta**	December 7, 1940	University of Massachusetts Amherst	Amherst, Massachusetts	Active	
**Oregon State Omega**	April 21, 1941	Oregon State University	Corvallis, Oregon	Active	
**NC State Pi Alpha**	March 27, 1942	North Carolina State University	Raleigh, North Carolina	Active	
CCNY Pi Beta	March 28, 1942	City College of New York	New York City, New York	Inactive	
**West Virginia Pi Gamma**	March 31, 1942	West Virginia University	Morgantown, West Virginia	Active	
**Iowa State Pi Epsilon**	November 12, 1942	Iowa State University	Ames, Iowa	Active	
**Marquette Pi Delta**	November 22, 1942	Marquette University	Milwaukee, Wisconsin	Active	
**NYU Pi Zeta**	January 24, 1943	New York University	New York City, New York	Active	
**Northwestern Pi Theta**	May 14, 1943	Northwestern University	Evanston, Illinois	Active	
**Duke Pi Iota**	May 13, 1944	Duke University	Durham, North Carolina	Active	
**Kentucky Pi Lambda**	May 24, 1947	University of Kentucky	Lexington, Kentucky	Active	
**MIT Pi Kappa**	May 29, 1947	Massachusetts Institute of Technology	Cambridge, Massachusetts	Active	
**Syracuse Pi Nu**	April 30, 1948	Syracuse University	Syracuse, New York	Active	
**Ohio State Pi Mu**	May 7, 1948	Ohio State University	Columbus, Ohio	Active	
**Utah Pi Xi**	May 14, 1948	University of Utah	Salt Lake City, Utah	Active	
**Alabama Pi Omicron**	May 14, 1948	University of Alabama	Tuscaloosa, Alabama	Active	
**New York Poly Pi Pi**	May 20, 1948	Brooklyn Collegiate and Polytechnic Institute New York University Tandon School of Engineering	Brooklyn, New York	Active	(Note: Chapter was originally called Brooklyn Poly Pi Pi as it was formed at Brooklyn Collegiate and Polytechnic Institute, now called New York University Tandon School of Engineering.)
**Michigan Pi Rho**	October 22, 1948	University of Michigan	Ann Arbor, Michigan	Active	
**New Mexico Pi Sigma**	November 29, 1948	University of New Mexico	Albuquerque, New Mexico	Active	
**NDSU Pi Upsilon**	December 13, 1948	North Dakota State University	Fargo, North Dakota	Active	
**Johns Hopkins Tau Alpha**	March 23, 1949	Johns Hopkins University	Baltimore, Maryland	Active	
**Washington Pi Chi**	May 6, 1949	Washington University in St. Louis	St. Louis, Missouri	Active	
**USC Tau Beta**	May 13, 1949	University of Southern California	Los Angeles, California	Active	
**California Pi Omega**	May 14, 1949	University of California, Berkeley	Berkeley, California	Active	
**Cooper Union Pi Phi**	May 21, 1949	Cooper Union	New York City, New York	Active	
**Connecticut Pi Psi**	May 21, 1949	University of Connecticut	Storrs, Connecticut	Active	
**Tennessee Tau Eta**	April 24, 1950	University of Tennessee	Knoxville, Tennessee	Active	
**New Mexico Tau Delta**	April 13, 1950	New Mexico State University	Las Cruces, New Mexico	Active	
**MSU Tau Epsilon**	April 27, 1950	Michigan State University	East Lansing, Michigan	Active	
**Clarkson Tau Gamma**	May 19, 1950	Clarkson University	Potsdam, New York	Active	
**LSU Tau Zeta**	April 20, 1951	Louisiana State University	Baton Rouge, Louisiana	Active	
**NJIT Tau Theta**	May 25, 1951	New Jersey Institute of Technology	Newark, New Jersey	Active	(Note: Chapter was originally called Newark Tau Theta as it was formed at the Newark College of Engineering, now called the New Jersey Institute of Technology.)
**Rutgers Tau Iota**	March 5, 1952	Rutgers University–New Brunswick	Piscataway, New Jersey	Active	
**Northeastern Tau Kappa**	April 12, 1952	Northeastern University	Boston, Massachusetts	Active	
**Alpha Omega**	1954	Chapter-At-Large		Active	
**Missouri Tau Lambda**	April 16, 1955	Missouri University of Science and Technology	Rolla, Missouri	Active	
**Maryland Tau Mu**	April 14, 1956	University of Maryland, College Park	College Park, Maryland	Active	
**Mississippi State Tau Nu**	April 8, 1957	Mississippi State University	Mississippi State, Mississippi	Active	
**Louisiana Tech Tau Xi**	April 23, 1957	Louisiana Tech University	Ruston, Louisiana	Active	
**Pratt Tau Omicron**	April 9, 1958	Pratt Institute	Brooklyn, New York	Active	
**Villanova Tau Pi**	April 10, 1958	Villanova University	Villanova, Pennsylvania	Active	
**Montana State Tau Rho**	May 12, 1958	Montana State University	Bozeman, Montana	Active	
**SMU Tau Sigma**	May 17, 1958	Southern Methodist University	Dallas, Texas	Active	
**WPI Tau Tau**	March 8, 1959	Worcester Polytechnic Institute	Worcester, Massachusetts	Active	
**Arkansas Tau Upsilon**	May 8, 1959	University of Arkansas	Fayetteville, Arkansas	Active	
Wayne State Tau Phi	May 20, 1960	Wayne State University	Detroit, Michigan	Inactive	
**South Dakota State Tau Chi**	March 6, 1961	South Dakota State University	Brookings, South Dakota	Active	
**Colorado State Tau Psi**	March 8, 1961	Colorado State University	Fort Collins, Colorado	Active	
**Bradley Tau Omega**	May 11, 1961	Bradley University	Peoria, Illinois	Active	
**UL Lafayette Sigma Alpha**	May 13, 1961	University of Louisiana at Lafayette	Lafayette, Louisiana	Active	(Note: Chapter was originally called USL Sigma Alpha as it was formed at the University of Southwestern Louisiana, now called the University of Louisiana at Lafayette.)
**Notre Dame Sigma Beta**	March 24, 1963	University of Notre Dame	Notre Dame, Indiana	Active	
**Arizona State Sigma Gamma**	April 25, 1964	Arizona State University	Tempe, Arizona	Active	
**Texas A&M Sigma Delta**	May 21, 1964	Texas A&M University	College Station, Texas	Active	
**Texas Tech Sigma Epsilon**	April 15, 1966	Texas Tech University	Lubbock, Texas	Active	
**Houston Sigma Zeta**	April 16, 1966	University of Houston	Houston, Texas	Active	
**California Sigma Eta**	May 13, 1966	California State University, Long Beach	Long Beach, California	Active	
San Diego State Sigma Theta	May 14, 1966	San Diego State University	San Diego, California	Inactive	
**Michigan Tech Sigma Iota**	April 1, 1967	Michigan Technological University	Houghton, Michigan	Active	
**Cal State LA Sigma Kappa**	February 15, 1968	California State University, Los Angeles	Los Angeles, California	Active	
Rose-Hulman Sigma Lambda	February 21, 1968	Rose–Hulman Institute of Technology	Terre Haute, Indiana	Inactive	
**Pennsylvania Sigma Mu**	April 21, 1968	University of Pennsylvania	Philadelphia, Pennsylvania	Active	
**Tennessee Sigma Nu**	May 11, 1968	Tennessee Tech	Cookeville, Tennessee	Active	
**Lamar Sigma Xi**	May 17, 1968	Lamar University	Beaumont, Texas	Active	
**Florida Sigma Omicron**	May 25, 1968	University of Florida	Gainesville, Florida	Active	
**Hawaii Sigma Pi**	January 20, 1969	University of Hawaiʻi at Mānoa	Honolulu, Hawaii	Active	
**Texas Sigma Rho**	May 16, 1969	University of Texas at Arlington	Arlington, Texas	Active	
**WSU Sigma Sigma**	May 17, 1969	Wichita State University	Wichita, Kansas	Active	
**Manhattan Sigma Tau**	September 12, 1969	Manhattan University	Riverdale, Bronx, New York	Active	
**Miami Sigma Upsilon**	January 22, 1970	University of Miami	Coral Gables, Florida	Active	
**Rhode Island Sigma Phi**	May 13, 1970	University of Rhode Island	Kingston, Rhode Island	Active	
Tulane Sigma Chi	May 15, 1970	Tulane University	New Orleans, Louisiana	Inactive	
**Tuskegee Sigma Psi**	December 7, 1970	Tuskegee University	Tuskegee, Alabama	Active	
**Texas Delta Gamma**	Spring 1971	University of Texas at El Paso	El Paso, Texas	Active	
Lafayette Sigma Omega	April 20, 1971	Lafayette College	Easton, Pennsylvania	Inactive	
**Vanderbilt Delta Alpha**	April 22, 1971	Vanderbilt University	Nashville, Tennessee	Active	
**Cal Poly Pomona Delta Beta**	May 10, 1971	California State Polytechnic University, Pomona	Pomona, California	Active	
**Tri-State Delta Delta**	December 5, 1972	Trine University	Angola, Indiana	Active	
**North Carolina Delta Epsilon**	December 9, 1972	North Carolina A&T State University	Greensboro, North Carolina	Active	
**New Haven Delta Zeta**	March 31, 1973	University of New Haven	West Haven, Connecticut	Active	
**Hartford Delta Eta**	June 1, 1973	University of Hartford	West Hartford, Connecticut	Active	
**West Virginia Delta Theta**	November 3, 1973	West Virginia University Institute of Technology	Beckley, West Virginia	Active	
**Toledo Delta Iota**	February 23, 1974	University of Toledo	Toledo, Ohio	Active	
Northrop Delta Kappa	March 22, 1975	Northrop University	Inglewood, California	Inactive	(Note: The university closed in 1991.)
New York Delta Lambda	April 19, 1975	University at Buffalo	Buffalo, New York	Inactive	
**Southern Delta Mu**	April 26, 1975	Southern University	Baton Rouge, Louisiana	Active	
**Dayton Delta Nu**	March 25, 1977	University of Dayton	Dayton, Ohio	Active	
**Virginia Delta Xi**	April 30, 1977	University of Virginia	Charlottesville, Virginia	Active	
**Columbia Delta Omicron**	May 13, 1977	Columbia University	New York City, New York	Active	
**Rochester Delta Pi**	May 14, 1977	Rochester Institute of Technology	Rochester, New York	Active	
**Louisville Delta Rho**	October 28, 1977	University of Louisville	Louisville, Kentucky	Active	
**Central Florida Delta Sigma**	June 2, 1978	University of Central Florida	Orlando, Florida	Active	
**South Carolina Delta Tau**	September 8, 1978	University of South Carolina	Columbia, South Carolina	Active	
**Alabama Delta Upsilon**	November 21, 1978	University of Alabama in Huntsville	Huntsville, Alabama	Active	
**UCSB Delta Phi**	May 19, 1979	University of California, Santa Barbara	Santa Barbara, California	Active	
**Kettering Delta Chi**	October 6, 1979	Kettering University	Flint, Michigan	Active	
**Naval Academy Delta Psi**	March 20, 1980	United States Naval Academy	Annapolis, Maryland	Active	
**Old Dominion Delta Omega**	March 27, 1981	Old Dominion University	Norfolk, Virginia	Active	
**South Dakota Phi Alpha**	April 3, 1981	South Dakota School of Mines and Technology	Rapid City, South Dakota	Active	
**George Washington Phi Gamma**	April 24, 1981	George Washington University	Washington, D.C.	Active	
**Prairie View Phi Delta**	April 27, 1981	Prairie View A&M University	Prairie View, Texas	Active	
**San Jose Phi Zeta**	October 8, 1982	San Jose State University	San Jose, California	Active	
**Lowell Phi Epsilon**	September 24, 1982	University of Massachusetts Lowell	Lowell, Massachusetts	Active	
**Missouri KC Phi Eta**	April 30, 1983	University of Missouri–Kansas City	Kansas City, Missouri	Active	
**Lawrence Phi Iota**	May 21, 1984	Lawrence Technological University	Southfield, Michigan	Active	
**Clemson Phi Kappa**	September 10, 1984	Clemson University	Clemson, South Carolina	Active	
**Memphis Phi Lambda**	October 29, 1984	University of Memphis	Memphis, Tennessee	Active	
**Delaware Phi Mu**	April 22, 1985	University of Delaware	Newark, Delaware	Active	
**Washington Phi Nu**	May 22, 1985	University of Washington	Seattle, Washington	Active	
**South Alabama Phi Xi**	October 26, 1985	University of South Alabama	Mobile, Alabama	Active	
**Western Michigan Phi Pi**	December 5, 1985	Western Michigan University	Kalamazoo, Michigan	Active	
**Stevens Phi Omicron**	October 17, 1986	Stevens Institute of Technology	Hoboken, New Jersey	Active	
**Evansville Phi Rho**	May 6, 1987	University of Evansville	Evansville, Indiana	Active	
**Colorado Phi Sigma**	October 23, 1987	University of Colorado Denver	Denver, Colorado	Active	
UAB Phi Tau	November 21, 1987	University of Alabama at Birmingham	Birmingham, Alabama	Inactive	
**Texas A&I Phi Upsilon**	December 5, 1987	Texas A&M University–Kingsville	Kingsville, Texas	Active	
**Wisconsin Phi Phi**	April 23, 1989	University of Wisconsin–Milwaukee	Milwaukee, Wisconsin	Active	
**New Orleans Phi Chi**	November 12, 1989	University of New Orleans	New Orleans, Louisiana	Active	
**Cal Poly San Luis Obispo Phi Psi**	March 3, 1990	California Polytechnic State University, San Luis Obispo	San Luis Obispo, California	Active	
**Gannon Phi Omega**	April 28, 1990	Gannon University	Erie, Pennsylvania	Active	
**Union Alpha Alpha**	May 5, 1990	Union College	Schenectady, New York	Active	
**UC Irvine Alpha Beta**	May 19, 1990	University of California, Irvine	Irvine, California	Active	
**South Florida Alpha Gamma**	March 11, 1991	University of South Florida	Tampa, Florida	Active	
**Tennessee State Alpha Delta**	March 29, 1991	Tennessee State University	Nashville, Tennessee	Active	
Wyoming Phi Beta	April 4, 1981	University of Wyoming	Laramie, Wyoming	Inactive	
**Santa Clara Alpha Epsilon**	April 29, 1991	Santa Clara University	Santa Clara, California	Active	
**Maine Alpha Zeta**	April 24, 1992	University of Maine	Orono, Maine	Active	
**New York Alpha Eta**	April 21, 1993	Binghamton University	Vestal, New York	Active	
**Wisconsin Alpha Theta**	April 23, 1993	University of Wisconsin–Platteville	Platteville, Wisconsin	Active	
**FAMU-FSU Alpha Iota**	April 16, 1994	Florida A&M University – Florida State University College of Engineering	Tallahassee, Florida	Active	
**Florida International Alpha Kappa**	April 18, 1994	Florida International University, Downtown Miami Center	Miami, Florida	Active	
**Tufts Alpha Lambda**	April 21, 1994	Tufts University	Medford, Massachusetts	Active	
NYIT Alpha Nu	April 28, 1994	New York Institute of Technology	New York City, New York	Inactive	
**SUNY-Stony Brook Alpha Xi**	April 29, 1994	Stony Brook University	Stony Brook, New York	Active	
**Boston University Alpha Mu**	November 29, 1994	Boston University	Boston, Massachusetts	Active	
**Ohio Alpha Omicron**	May 10, 1996	Ohio University	Athens, Ohio	Active	
**Michigan-Dearborn Alpha Pi**	October 25, 1996	University of Michigan–Dearborn	Dearborn, Michigan	Active	
**UIC Alpha Sigma**	October 23, 1999	University of Illinois Chicago	Chicago, Illinois	Active	
**Florida Tech Alpha Rho**	April 27, 2000	Florida Institute of Technology	Melbourne, Florida	Active	
**Saint Martin's Alpha Tau**	April 3, 2003	Saint Martin's University	Lacey, Washington	Active	
**Puerto Rico Alpha Phi**	April 29, 2003	University of Puerto Rico at Mayagüez	Mayagüez, Puerto Rico	Active	
**SIUE Alpha Chi**	May 1, 2003	Southern Illinois University Edwardsville	Edwardsville, Illinois	Active	
IUPUI Alpha Upsilon	2005	Indiana University–Purdue University Indianapolis	Indianapolis, Indiana	Inactive	(Note: In 2024, IUPUI split into two separate universities, Indiana University Indianapolis and Purdue University in Indianapolis.)
**VMI Alpha Psi**	April 23, 2007	Virginia Military Institute	Lexington, Virginia	Active	
**Temple Beta Alpha**	February 8, 2009	Temple University	Philadelphia, Pennsylvania	Active	
**Baylor Beta Beta**	February 8, 2009	Baylor University	Waco, Texas	Active	
**Fresno State Beta Gamma**	February 28, 2010	California State University, Fresno	Fresno, California	Active	
**San Diego Beta Delta**	February 11, 2011	University of San Diego	San Diego, California	Active	
**Cal Maritime Beta Epsilon**	March 3, 2012	California State University Maritime Academy	Vallejo, California	Active	
**Texas A&M Qatar Beta Zeta**	April 24, 2012	Texas A&M University at Qatar	Doha, Qatar	Active	
**North Texas Beta Eta**	February 22, 2014	University of North Texas	Denton, Texas	Active	
**Guanajuato Beta Theta**	February 28, 2015	Universidad de Guanajuato	Salamanca, Guanajuato, Mexico	Active	
**Georgia Southern Beta Iota**	February 28, 2015	Georgia Southern University	Statesboro, Georgia	Active	
**Norwich Beta Kappa**	February 25, 2017	Norwich University	Northfield, Vermont	Active	
**Northern Illinois Beta Lambda**	February 24, 2018	Northern Illinois University	DeKalb, Illinois	Active	
**Embry-Riddle Beta Mu**	February 24, 2018	Embry–Riddle Aeronautical University, Daytona Beach	Daytona Beach, Florida	Active	
**Nevada Reno Beta Nu**	February 24, 2018	University of Nevada, Reno	Reno, Nevada	Active	
**AU Sharjah Beta Xi**	2018	American University of Sharjah	Sharjah, Emirate of Sharjah, United Arab Emirates	Active	
**CUA Beta Omicron**	May 13, 2021	Catholic University of America	Washington, D.C.	Active	
