= Southwest Campus of Florida State University =

Campus description Florida State University

Coordinates: 30.423°N 84.317°W

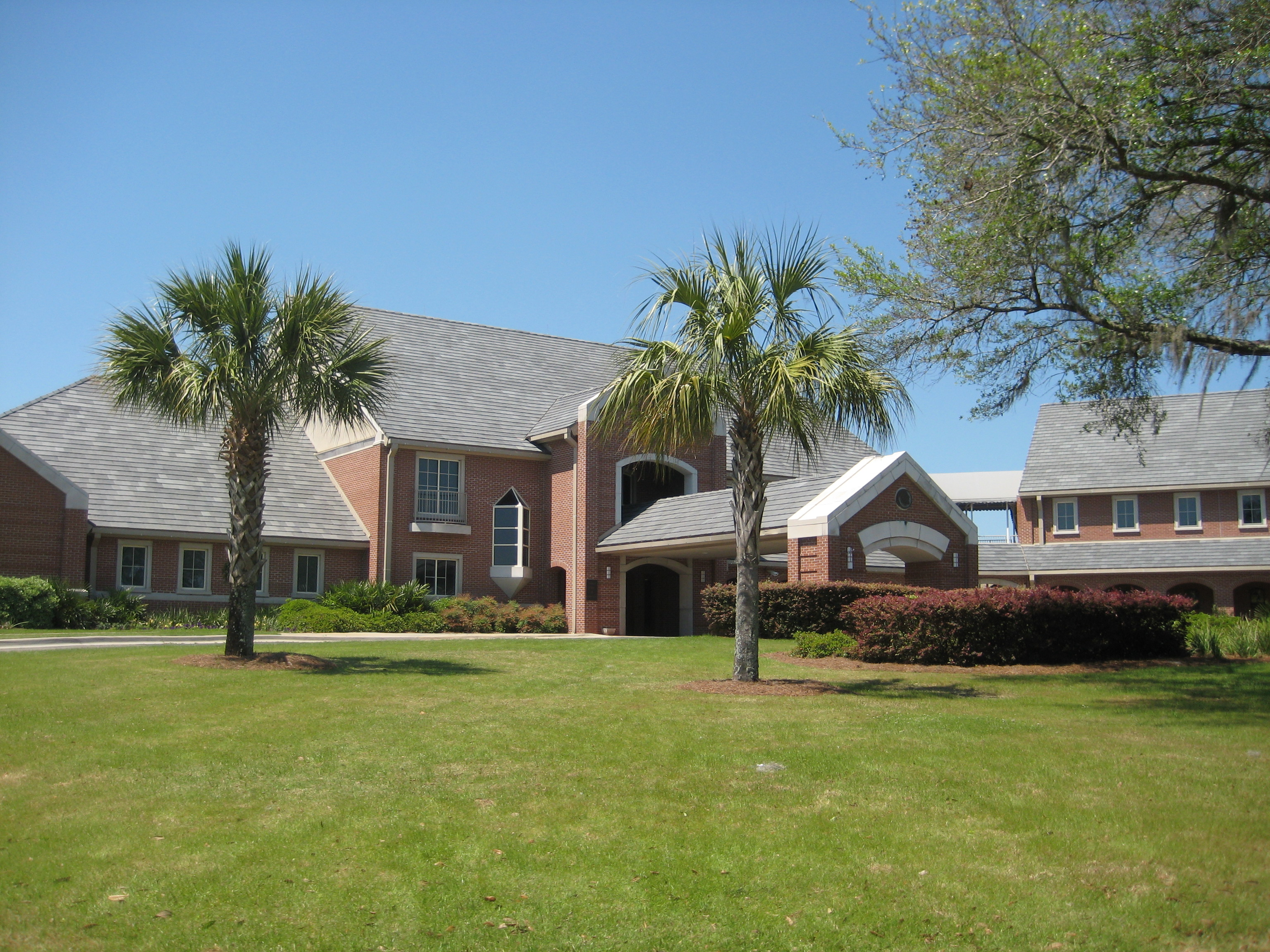
Don Veller Seminole Golf Course

The FSU Southwest Campus (SWC) of Florida State University (FSU) is located in Tallahassee about a mile to the southwest of the Main Campus on approximately 740 acres (3.0 km^{2}) remaining out of a large parcel often called "The Farm", a nickname derived from a dairy farm that once operated on the site.

== Usage ==
Over the years portions of The Farm have been converted to other uses, such as housing, research, golf, mass media and academics. The Southwest campus includes the FSU Foundation and Research buildings, Florida A&M University – Florida State University College of Engineering and the new Advanced Materials Research building. Two athletic complexes are found here; the Morcorm Aquatics Center and Don Veller Golf Course as well as the WFSU Public Broadcast Center (WFSU-TV and WFSU-FM).

To the east and northwest, the SWC abuts residential neighborhoods. The north side adjoins and intermingles with Innovation Park, the research park of which FSU is a participant and within which FSU owns the property on which the National High Magnetic Field Laboratory is located. Orange Avenue defines the southern border and Rankin Avenue denotes the far west. Large parcels of the SWC are occupied by venerable Alumni Village on the east side, a student housing complex, the par 73, Don Veller Seminole Golf Course in the middle, and the new Intramural Fields in the northwest corner.

Innovation Park was carved out of the original "Farm" property. FSU retains ownership of the parcels for the prestigious National High Magnetic Field Laboratory. Along Levy Street, FSU has begun development of a series of academic-oriented research facilities to house pure research and related centers, institutes, and technology transfer organizations.

== Images ==
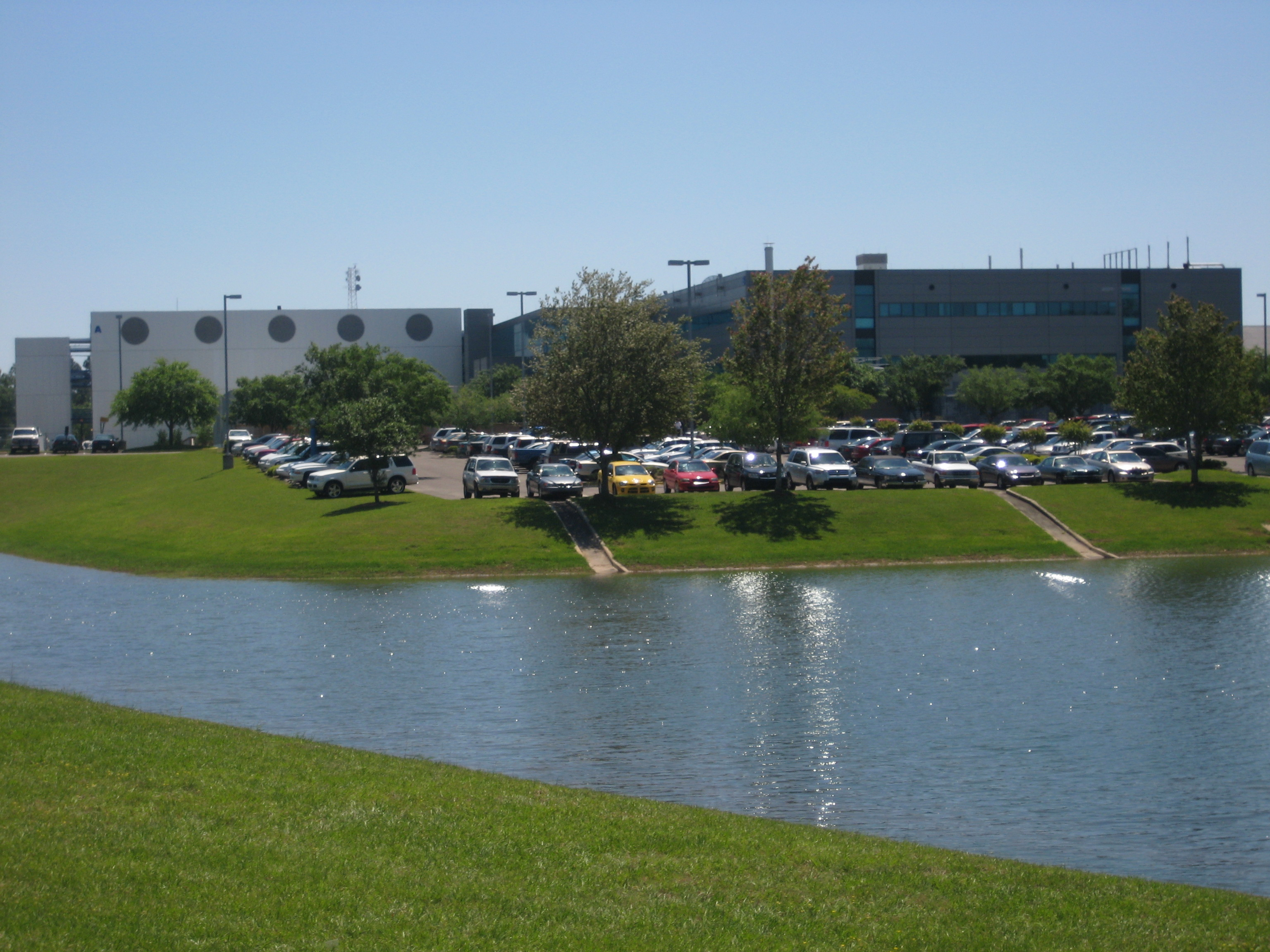
FSU College of Engineering buildings A and B

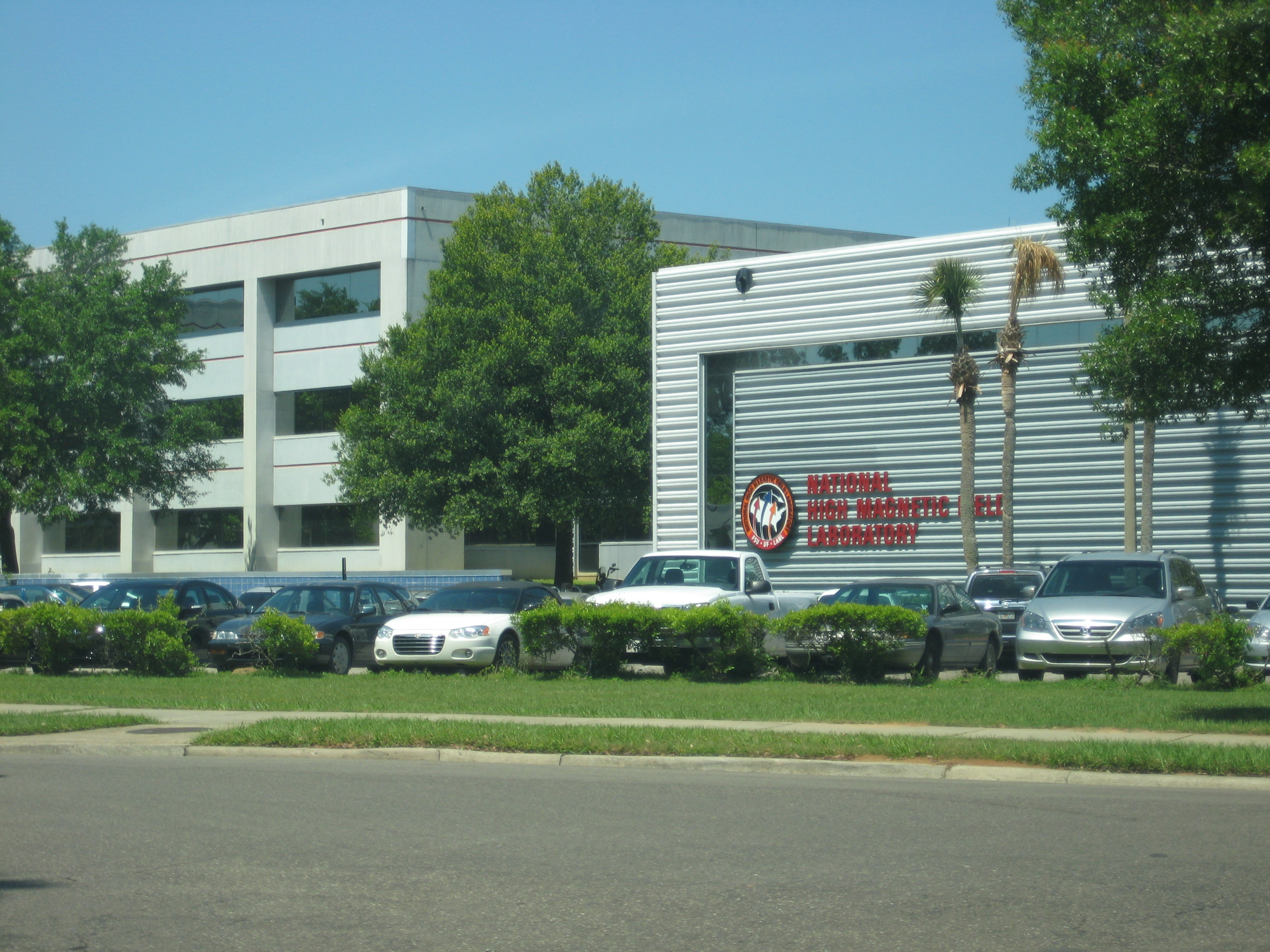
The Mag Lab

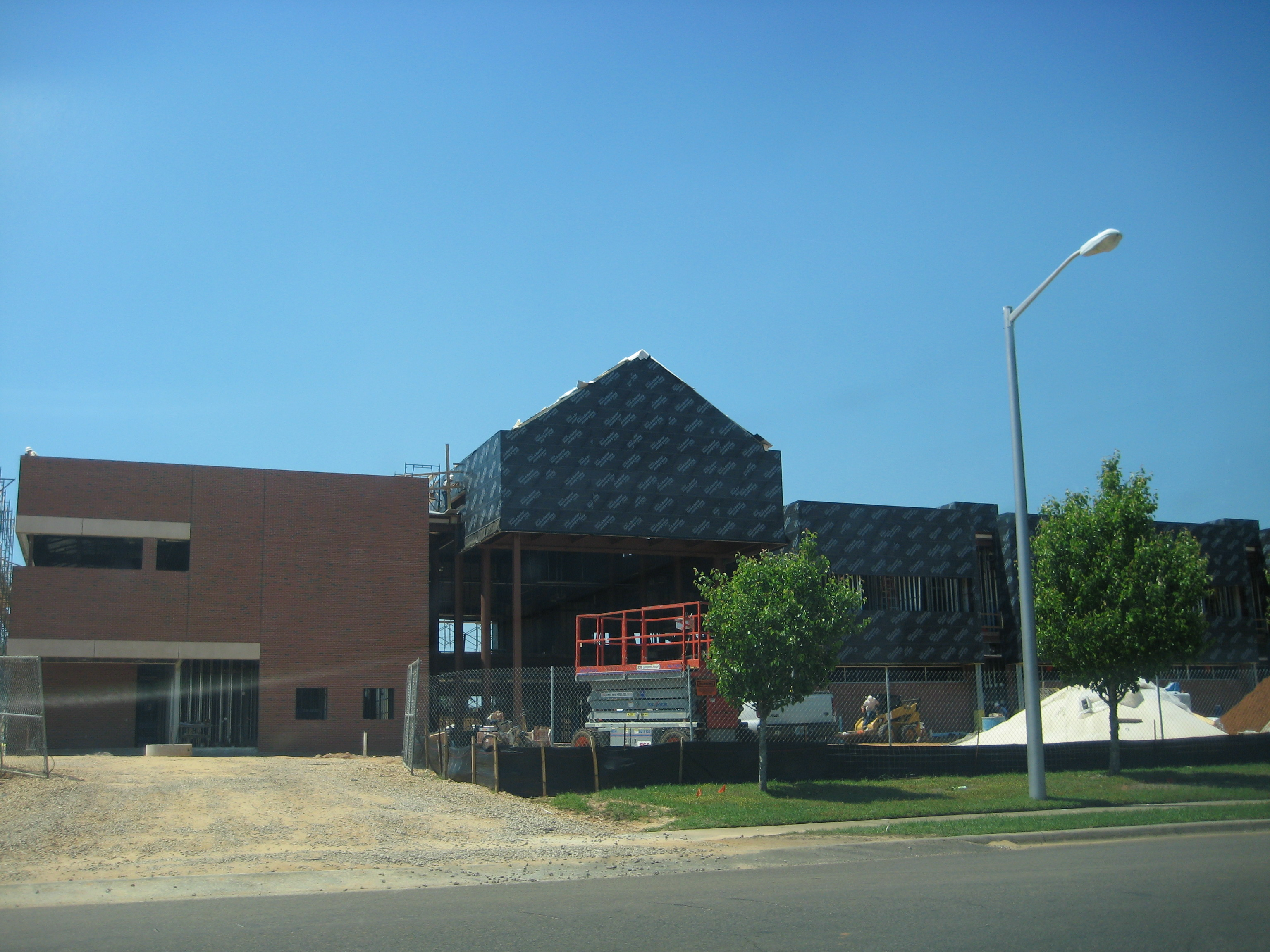
FSU Advanced Materials Research building

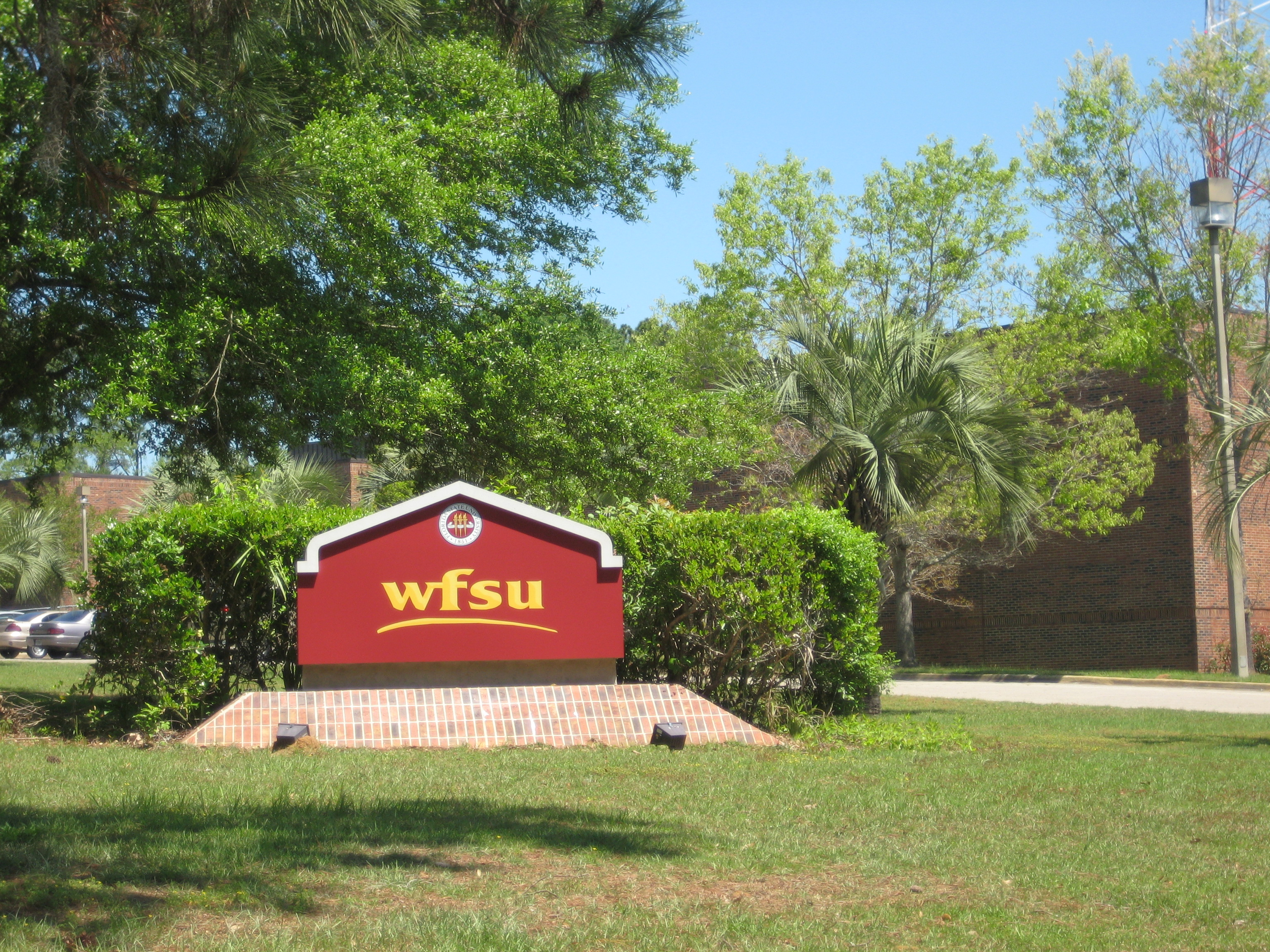
WFSU Public Broadcast Center (WFSU-TV and WFSU-FM)

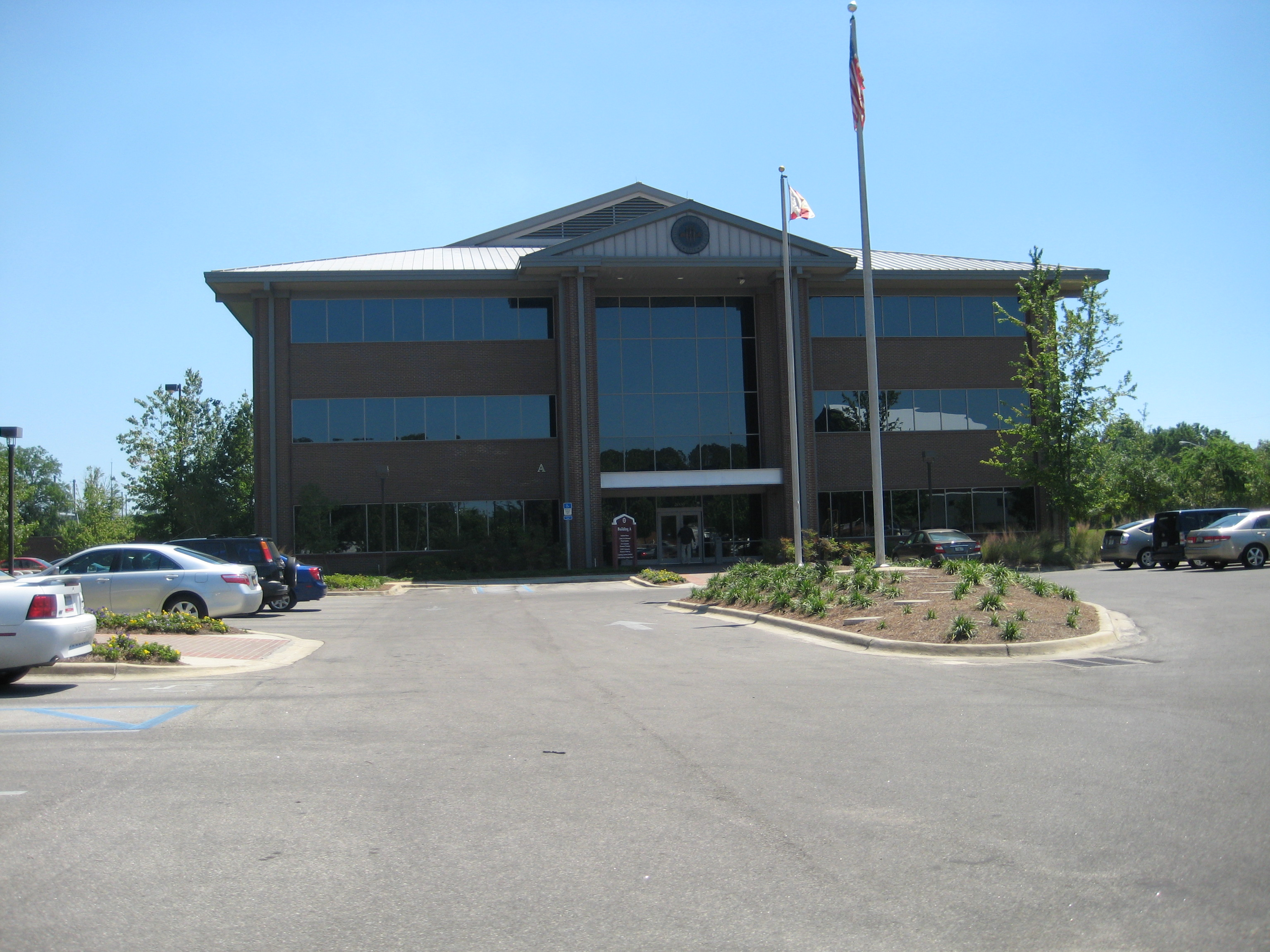
FSU Foundation and Research building A

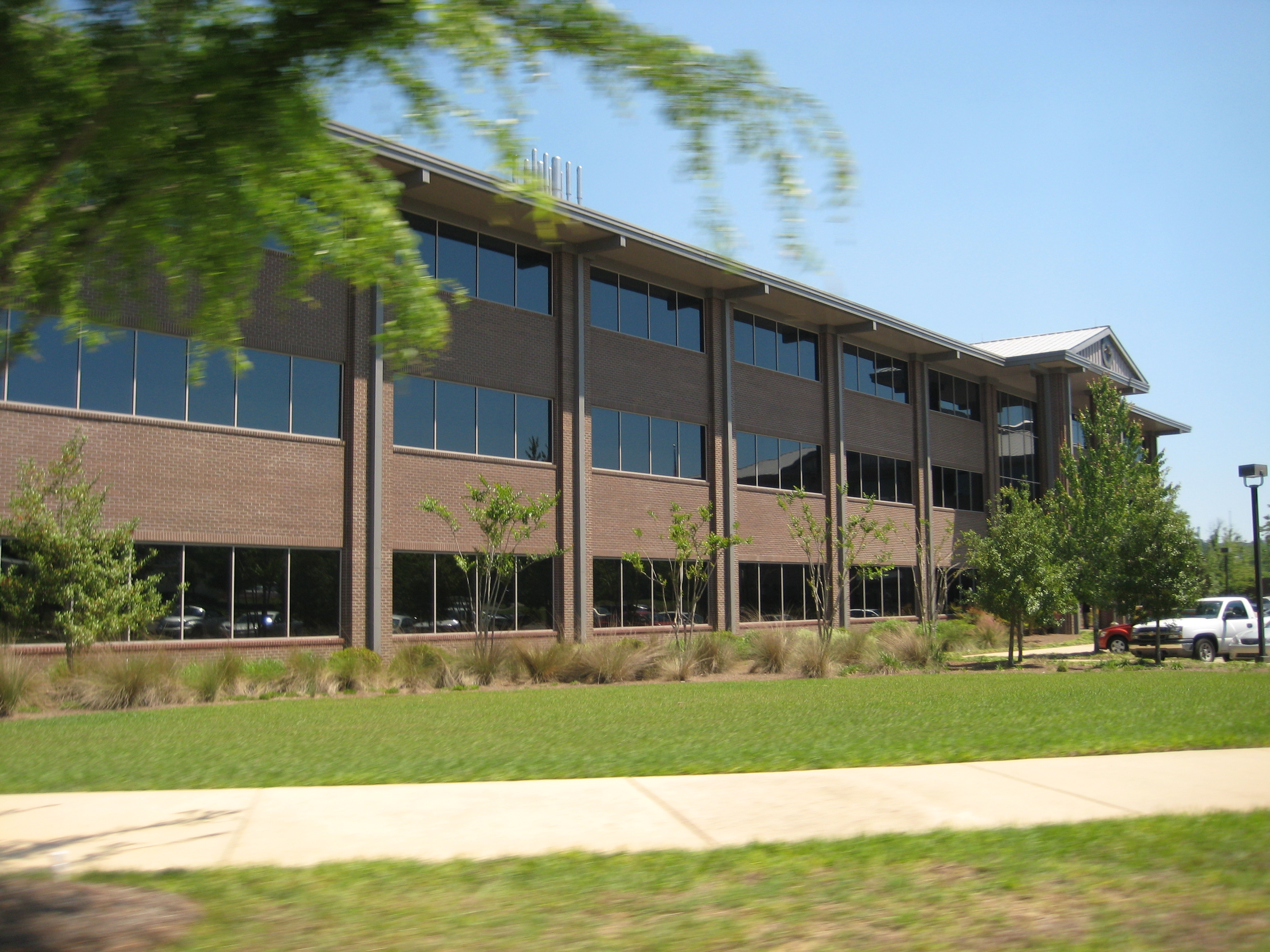
FSU Foundation and Research building B
