= Florida State University College of Business =

Business school of Florida State University

Florida State University Herbert Wertheim College of Business
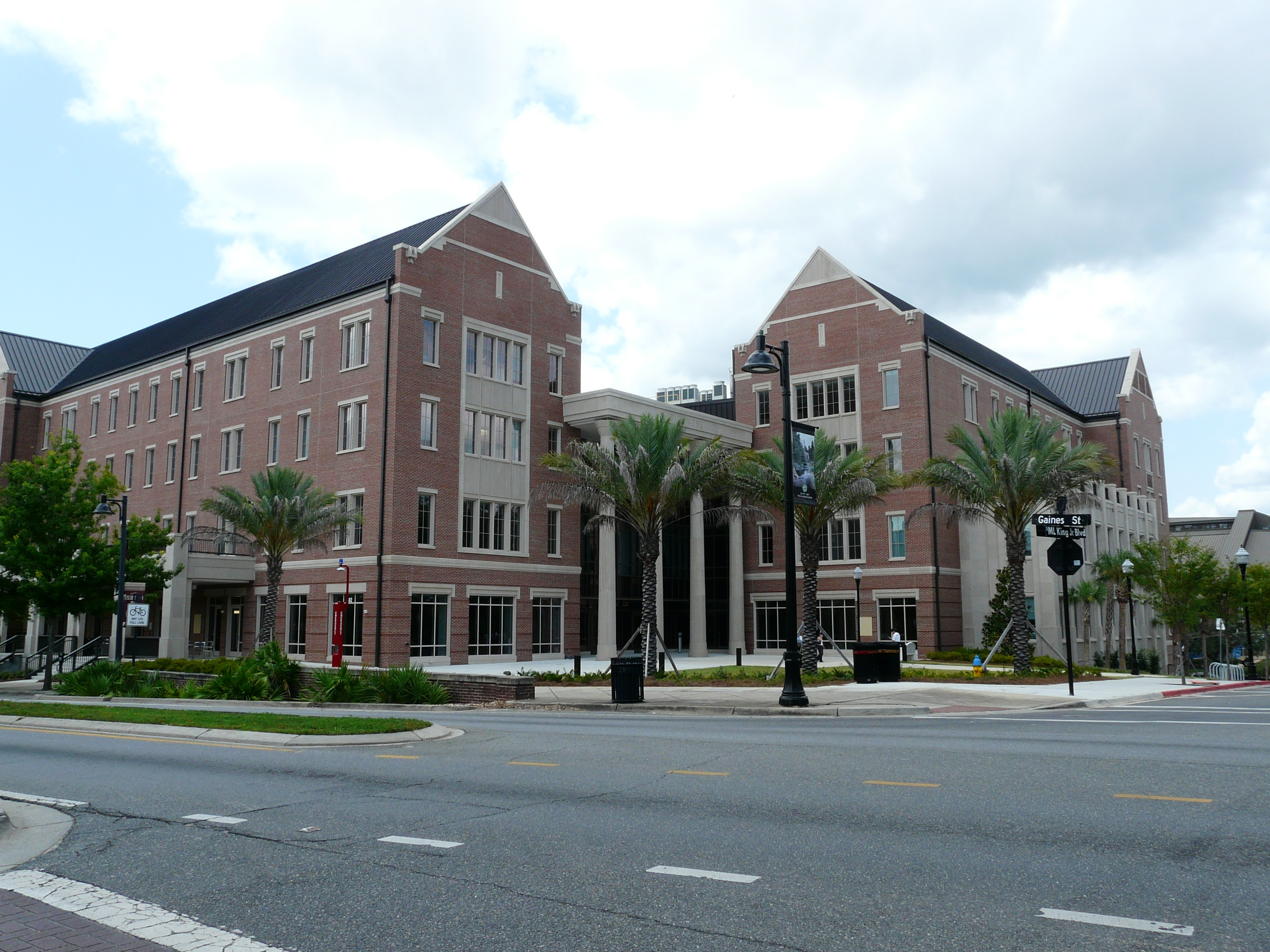
- Type: Business school
- Established: 1950
- Affiliations: Florida State University
- Dean: Michael D. Hartline
- Students: 7,031
- Undergraduates: 5,990
- Postgraduates: 861
- Doctoral students: 40
- Location: Tallahassee, Florida, U.S. 30°26′37.9″N 84°17′42.0″W
- Website: wertheim.fsu.edu

The Florida State University Herbert Wertheim College of Business is the business school of the Florida State University. Established in 1950, it enrolls more than 6,000 students including undergraduates and graduate students seeking their bachelor's, master's or doctoral degrees. All programs are accredited by the Association to Advance Collegiate Schools of Business.

In December of 2025, the college was renamed the Herbert Wertheim College of Business, after a $65 philanthropic donation from Herbert Wertheim. In January 2026, the business college moved into its new facility, Legacy Hall, which was renamed the Herbert Wertheim Center for Business Excellence shortly thereafter.

The Herbert Wertheim Center for Business Excellence is the largest building on the Florida State University campus. The five-story building provides collaborative environments, auditoriums, a café, and interview rooms, among other facilities.

== Graduate programs ==
=== Master's degree programs ===
Master of Accounting (MAcc)

This program fulfills the educational requirements that are needed to be a licensed Certified Public Accountant in the state of Florida and other jurisdictions. In this program, students can choose one of three majors: Assurance and Advisory Services, Generalist and Taxation.

Master of Business Administration (MBA)

Every format consists of the same core curriculum and requires that 39 credit hours be completed before graduation. Students can customize their degrees with one of the following specializations: Business Analytics, Finance, Human Resources, Management Information Systems, Real Estate, Risk Management and Insurance or Supply Chain Management. The following are the primary formats:

- Accelerated, full-Time MBA
- Evening, part-time MBA
- Online, part-time MBA
- Online, part-time MBA with Real Estate Specialization
- Joint JD/MBA pathway
- Joint MSW/MBA Pathway

Master of Science in Business Analytics (MS-BA)

This one-year program requires students to complete 11 courses (33 credit hours) during three semesters on campus. This program qualifies as a STEM degree (Science, Technology, Engineering or Mathematics), as defined by the U.S. Department of Education, and is open to all quantitative majors.

Master of Science in Finance (MSF)

This program is completed on-campus and consists of 32 credit hours plus a non-credit professional development series. As part of the program, students manage an investment fund worth more than $4 million. MSF students can also choose to specialize in real estate.

Master of Science in Management Information Systems (MS-MIS)

The MS-MIS program is ranked No.16 on U.S. News & World Report's 2022 list of "Best Online Graduate Programs." This program is completed fully online and consists of 33 credit hours.

Master of Science in Risk Management and Insurance (MS-RMI)

This program is housed in the Dr. William T. Hold/The National Alliance Program in Risk Management and Insurance, which is one of the nation's oldest and largest insurance programs. Upon completion of the program, students are eligible to receive the following state licenses in Florida without sitting for the exams:

- General Lines Agent License (2-20)
- Health & Life (Including Annuities & Variable Contracts) Agent License (2-15)
- All-Lines Adjuster License (6-20)
- Personal Lines Agent License (20-44)
- Customer Representative (4-40)

=== Doctoral program ===
The college offers a Ph.D. in Business Administration in which students are admitted into one of seven program majors:

- Accounting
- Finance
- Management Information Systems
- Marketing
- Organizational Behavior and Human Resources
- Risk Management and Insurance
- Strategy

Florida State University is designated as a top-tier Carnegie Research Institution. Students typically complete their degree in five years and are expected to teach and research alongside other scholars.

== Undergraduate programs ==
The college offers 9 different undergraduate majors:

- Accounting
- Finance
- Human Resource Management
- Management
- Management Information Systems
- Marketing
- Professional Sales
- Real Estate
- Risk Management/Insurance

The college offers three undergraduate minor options:

- Business Analytics
- Free Enterprise & Ethics
- General Business

=== Combined (BS/master’s) pathways ===
Combined bachelor's/master's pathways allow students to complete graduate coursework while taking undergraduate classes. The program allows up to nine credit hours of coursework to be double counted toward the necessary requirements for both degrees. The pathway options are the following:

- BS-Accounting/Master of Accounting (MAcc)
- BS-Finance/Master of Business Administration (FIN/MBA)
- BS-Finance/Master of Science in Finance (MSF)
- BS-Human Resource Management/Master of Business Administration (HRM/MBA)
- BS-Management Information Systems/Master of Business Administration (MIS/MBA)
- BS-Management Information Systems/Master of Science in Management Information Systems (MS-MIS)
- BS-Marketing/Master of Business Administration (MAR/MBA)
- BS-Real Estate/Master of Business Administration (RE/MBA)
- BS-Real Estate/Master of Science in Finance (RE/MSF)
- BS-Risk Management/Insurance/Master of Business Administration (RMI/MBA)
- BS-Risk Management/Insurance/Master of Science in Risk Management and Insurance (MS-RMI)

=== The James M. Seneff Honors Program ===
The James M. Seneff Honors Program is an honors program that is based on the joint collaboration of the University Honors Program and the College of Business. The program was established in 2019 through a $2 million gift to the college by the CNL Charitable Foundation in honor of James M. Seneff. Seneff is also the founder and executive chairman of Orlando-based CNL Financial Group (CNL), a private investment management firm. The $2 million gift is part of a total $5 million, $3 million of which created the James M. Seneff Fund for Preeminence at the college. The James M. Seneff Fund for Preeminence will assist the college in funding future academic initiatives.

== Rankings ==
Graduate rankings among public universities:

#6	Online Graduate Business Program for Veterans (U.S. News & World Report's Best Graduate Business Programs, 2025)
#9	Master of Business Administration with Business Analytics Specialty (U.S. News & World Report’s Best Online MBA Programs, 2023)
#6	Master of Business Administration with Real Estate Specialty (U.S. News & World Report’s Best Graduate Schools, 2025)
#8	Online Master's in Management Information Systems (U.S. News & World Report’s Best Online Graduate Business Programs, 2022)
#8	Online Master's in Risk Management and Insurance (U.S. News & World Report’s Best Online Non-MBA Programs, 2022)
#16	Online Master's in Business Administration (U.S. News & World Report's Best Graduate Business Programs, 2025)
#28	Part-time Master's in Business Administration (U.S. News and World Report's Best Part-time MBA Programs, 2023)

Undergraduate rankings among public universities:

#3	Undergraduate Risk Management and Insurance Program (U.S. News & World Report’s Undergraduate Business Programs in Insurance, 2025)
#4	Undergraduate Real Estate Program (U.S. News & World Report’s Undergraduate Business Programs in Real Estate, 2025)
#18	Undergraduate Marketing Program (U.S. News & World Report's Best Undergraduate Programs in Marketing, 2025)
#20	Undergraduate Accounting Program (U.S. News & World Report's Best Undergraduate Programs in Accounting, 2025)
#31	Overall Undergraduate Programs (U.S. News & World Report's Best Colleges, 2025)

== Structure ==
=== History ===
Business education at Florida State traces its roots to 1916 when the Florida State College for Women (FSCW) established a two-year program in business education within the College of Arts and Sciences. Ten years after its beginning, the two-year business program became a four-year program leading to a bachelor's degree. Returning soldiers using the G.I. Bill after World War II stressed the state university system to the point that a Tallahassee Branch of the University of Florida (TBUF) was opened on the campus of the Florida State College for Women with the men housed in barracks on nearby Dale Mabry Field. By 1947 the Florida Legislature returned the FSCW to coeducational status and designated it Florida State University. In 1950, a separate establishment was founded as the School of Business. Although the School of Business was formally established in 1950, its first class graduated on December 15, 1949, when 27 students received Bachelor of Science degrees in business.

In the 1960s, both undergraduate and graduate programs were accredited by the Association to Advance Collegiate Schools of Business (AACSB International) and were producing more than 10 percent of the university's total headcount enrollment.

In 1974, the School of Business was designated the College of Business.

=== Departments ===
There are 6 departments housed in the College of Business:

- Department of Accounting
- Department of Business Analytics, Information Systems and Supply Chain
- Department of Finance
- Department of Management
- Department of Marketing
- Department of Risk Management/Insurance, Real Estate & Legal Studies

=== Buildings ===
==== Rovetta Business building ====
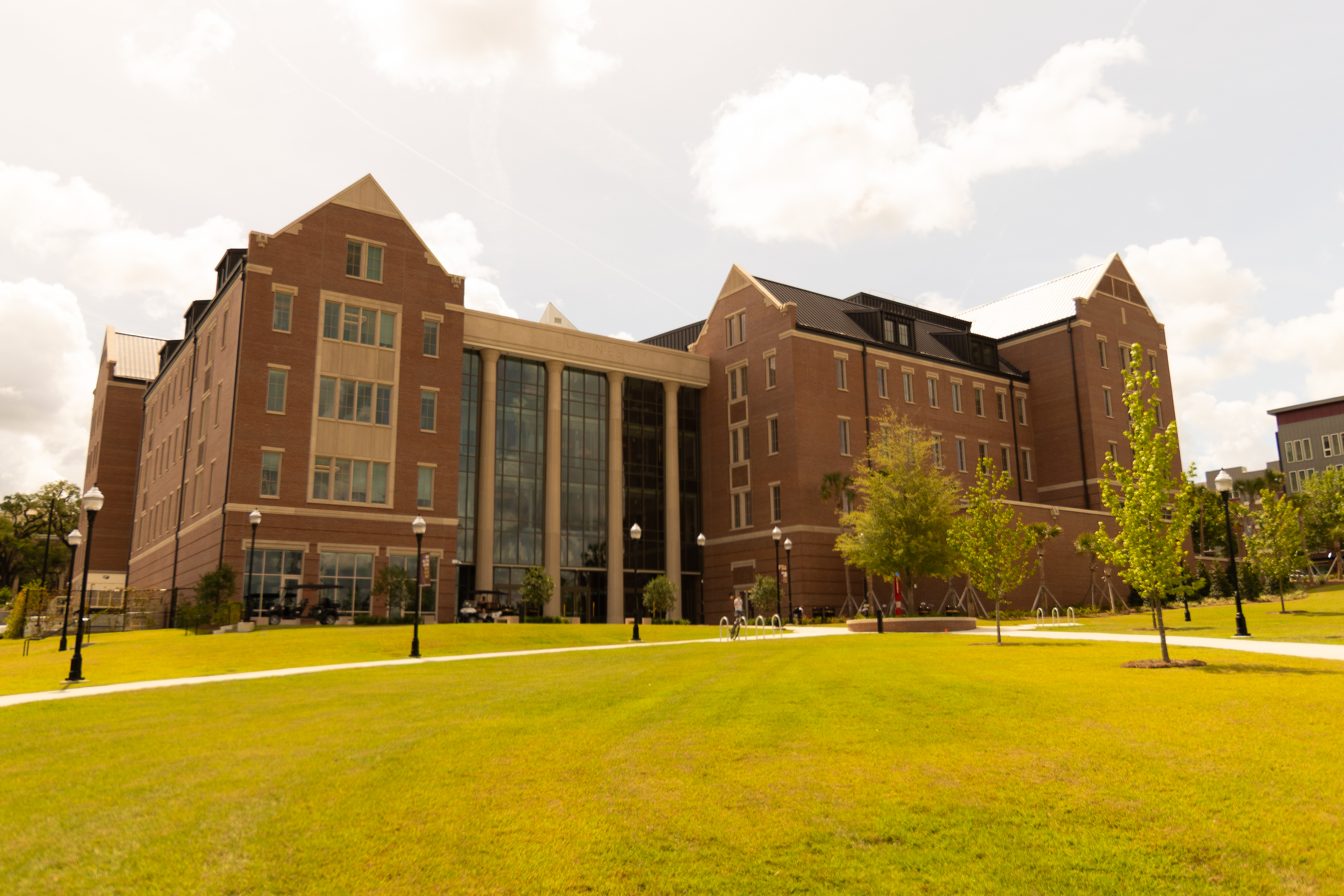
Florida State University Herbert Wertheim College of Business

The college's original building was completed in 1958 at a time when the College of Business enrolled roughly 800 students. In 1984, an annex was added, and the entire building was dedicated as the Charles A. Rovetta Business Building. At the time, the college enrolled 3,000 students.

The College of Business is presently located across from the Civic Center.

==== New building ====
In 2018 it was announced that a new 218,392 sq ft (20,289.3 m^{2}) campus building, Legacy Hall, would be constructed to serve as the new home for the College of Business. It will be located next to the Donald L. Tucker Civic Center and be part of the Arena District. It will be the largest academic space on FSU's campus with five floors, a central atrium, forum stairs with seating, a 300-seat auditorium, multipurpose event space and a financial trading room. Legacy Hall is part of FSU's top legislative priorities, and is currently expected to be completed in the summer of 2025.

== Student life ==
There are 30 student organizations, four business fraternities, two business leadership councils and four graduate student organizations affiliated with the College of Business. Students are also actively involved in various state, national and international business-related competitions such as: the Social Media Case Competition, the Scotiabank International Case Competition, the Global Bilingual Sales Competition at FIU, the Spring Seminole Case Competition, the Insurance Sales Challenge, the Seminole Sales Showcase, the Annual Bayou Sales Challenge and the AMA International Collegiate Conference.

=== Global learning opportunities ===
The college offers the following global learning opportunities for students:

- The College of Business Global Exchange program: Students spend a semester or full year with College of Business school partners across the globe. Some program locations include universities in: China, Finland, France, Germany, Netherlands, South Korea and Spain.
- Graduate Global Business Seminar: an academic course that counts as three hours of elective credit, where students spend the semester focused on lessons on the business environment of another country and then travel abroad to that country. Past destinations include Australia, Chile, France, Germany and South Korea with corporate visits to companies including Heineken, Kia, LG, Mercedes-Benz, Samsung Electronics and Steelcase International.
- International Accounting with EY: Ernst & Young has partnered with FSU to allow College of Business students to travel to their international headquarters in London, United Kingdom.

== Centers and institutes ==
The FSU College of Business is home to many research institutes and centers, and the college's faculty members take an active part in Florida State University's multidisciplinary programs.

- BB&T Center for Free Enterprise
- Carl DeSantis Center for Executive Education
- Center for Human Resource Management
- Center for Risk Management Education and Research
- Florida Catastrophic Storm Risk Management Center
- FSU Real Estate Center
- FSU Sales Institute
- Gene Taylor/Bank of America Center for Banking and Financial Studies
- Institute for Applied Business Research
- Jim Moran Institute for Global Entrepreneurship

== Alumni ==
=== Notable graduates ===
The college has an alumni network of over 80,000 graduates worldwide working in various industries.

- Allan Bense (MBA '74), Chairman, President and CEO, Bense Enterprises Inc.; Former Speaker, Florida House of Representatives
- Meg Gilbert Crofton (Marketing '74 & MBA '75), President, Walt Disney World Resort
- Hugh Durham (Marketing '59 & MBA '61), Retired Collegiate Basketball Head Coach
- Chuck Hardwick (Finance '62 & MBA '64), Senior Vice President, Corporate Affairs, Pfizer Inc.
- Admiral (Ret.) Paul David Miller (Finance '63), Admiral, United States Navy

=== Seminole 100 ===
Every year, The Jim Moran Institute for Global Entrepreneurship in Florida State University's College of Business releases its Seminole 100 list. This list recognizes some of the fastest-growing businesses owned or managed by Florida State University alumni. The Seminole 100 list includes businesses of all sizes and industries located throughout the United States.

The Seminole 100 list includes organizations led by College of Business alumni such as:

- Judy Schmeling (Accounting ’82), President, Cornerstone Brands and Chief Operating Officer, HSN Inc.
- James M. Seneff (Business Administration '68), Chairman & CEO, CNL Financial Group, Inc.
- Randell A. Smith (Accounting '77), CEO & Co-Founder, Smith Travel Research
- William G. Smith, Jr. (Finance '76), President & CEO, Capital City Bank Group, Inc.
- William F. Stephenson (Management '82), Chief Executive Officer & Chairman of the Executive Board, De Lage Landen International B.V.
- Cinny Streich Murray (Marketing '80), President, Chico's
- R. Eugene Taylor (Finance '69), President, Consumer & Commercial Banking, Bank of America
- John W. Thiel, (Accounting ’83) Vice Chairman of Global Wealth and Investment Management (Ret.), Merrill Lynch and Partner and Senior Advisor, My Next Season
- James "J.T." Thomas, Jr. (Business Administration '73), Former NFL Player and President, Three Rivers Barbecue, LLC
- John Thrasher (Business Administration '65 and Juris Doctor 72), President, Florida State University
- Fred Tresca (Accounting and Finance '82), Co-founder, Principal and Managing Director, Branta Group
- Ashbel “Ash” C. Williams, Jr., (Management '76 & MBA '78) Executive Director and Chief Investment Officer, Florida State Board of Administration
- Kenneth M. Willis (Marketing '76), President & CEO, Anewda Consulting and Retired, Vice President Strategy/Change Leadership, PepsiCo/Quaker

== See also ==
- List of United States business school rankings
- List of business schools in the United States
