= Florida State University student housing =

Student Housing
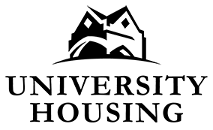
- Established: 1907
- Director: Shannon Staten
- Students: 6,712
- Location: Tallahassee, Florida, USA; 30°26′27.6″N 84°17′57.6″W
- Website: Official Housing Website

The Office of University Housing administers Student housing at Florida State University, both on and off-campus. More than 20% of all undergraduates reside in residence halls including 85% of first-time college students. On-campus housing is also available to professional and graduate students. Dormitories at Florida State include 18 residence halls on campus with 6,712 residents. All dormitories are co-ed with no single sex buildings. With few exceptions, all dormitories were constructed as suites with private bathrooms.

In 2009, the university celebrated the completion of a 15-year project that renovated the seven historic residence halls (built before 1950). The interiors were modernized while the original facades were retained. The construction began in 1992 with Jennie Murphree Hall and ended in 2006 with Landis Hall.

== Special interest housing ==
- There are ten Living‐Learning Community (LLC)s
- The University Honors Program in Landis Hall.

== Current Housing ==
Image	Name	Bld#	Abr	Address	Zone	Ft²	GPS Coord	Yr Blt	Cap	Notes/restrictions
	Azalea Hall	4062	AZL	824 W JEFFERSON ST	EAST	130,196	30.440213 -84.296078	2017	433	Restaurant 1851
	Broward Hall	0015	BRW	668 UNIVERSITY WAY	EAST	38,001	30.440251 -84.293508	1917	135	
	Bryan Hall	0014	BRY	182 CONVOCATION WAY	EAST	36,795	30.440727 -84.292806	1907	131	Learning Comm
	Cawthon Hall	0085	CAW	119 HONORS WAY	EAST	93,987	30.442433 -84.294421	1949	297	WIMSE
	Degraff Hall East	4023	RH8	808 W TENNESSEE ST	EAST	85,751	30.445157 -84.294477	2007	353	Social Science
	Degraff Hall West	4024	RH9	810 W TENNESSEE ST	EAST	84,102	30.445411 -84.295027	2007	353	Social Science
	Deviney Hall	4061	NDE	111 S WOODWARD AVE	WEST	105,173	30.440973 -84.297088	2014	433	
	Dorman Hall	4060	NDO	101 S WOODWARD AVE	WEST	109,305	30.440905 -84.297029	2014	439	
	Gilchrist Hall	0016	GIL	702 UNIVERSITY WAY	EAST	65,701	30.440391 -84.294052	1925	229	Honors
	Landis Hall	0074	LAN	714 UNIVERSITY WAY	EAST	106,835	30.440567 -84.295019	1935	403	Honors
	Magnolia Hall	4063	MGN	802 UNIVERSITY WAY	EAST	112,637	30.440103 -84.296335	2017	479	
	McCollum Hall	0075	EMH	1165 ACADEMIC WAY	WEST	87,574	30.447675 -84.303708	1975	196	Apartment
	Jennie Murphree Hall	0012	JMH	126 CONVOCATION WAY	EAST	74,991	30.441741 -84.292545	1921	328	
	Ragans Hall A	0495	RH1	923 LEARNING WAY	WEST	52,515	30.440349 -84.299442	2003	138	3/4 BR; 2 BA Apt; No Freshmen; Grad students
	Ragans Hall B	0496	RH2	921 LEARNING WAY	WEST	50,362	30.440473 -84.299002	2003	138	3/4 BR; 2 BA Apt; No Freshmen; Grad students
	Ragans Hall C	0497	RH3	930 W JEFFERSON ST	WEST	51,462	30.43999 -84.299543	2003	138	3/4 BR; 2 BA Apt; No Freshmen; Grad students
	Ragans Hall D	0498	RH4	916 W JEFFERSON ST	WEST	52,512	30.439722 -84.298847	2003	138	3/4 BR; 2 BA Apt; No Freshmen; Grad students
	Reynolds Hall	0013	REY	134 CONVOCATION WAY	EAST	71,650	30.441678 -84.292559	1911	239	Pre-Health
	Rogers Hall	0044	ROG	1147 ACADEMIC WAY	WEST	66,127	30.447422 -84.302812	1965	176	No Freshmen; Apartment
	Salley Hall	0046	SAL	1106 W CALL ST	WEST	125,176	30.445855 -84.303313	1963	570	
	Traditions Hall	4022	RH7	945 LEARNING WAY	WEST	125,708	30.441294 -84.2999	2012	276	2 BR; 1 BA Apt; No Freshmen; Grad students
	Wildwood Hall 1	4020	RH5	938 W JEFFERSON ST	WEST	80,257	30.439717 -84.299473	2007	353	Nursing
	Wildwood Hall 2	4021	RH6	202 VARSITY DR	WEST	80,105	30.44061 -84.300722	2007	359	Social Justice

== Former Housing ==
Image	Name	Address	Zone	GPS Coord	Built/ Demo'd	Cap	Notes/restrictions
	Alumni Memorial Village	157 HERLONG DR	INOV		1960–2015	1,100	Alumni Village was an 80-acre (32 ha) development of 96 buildings and 795 apartments southwest of FSU near Innovation Park. It opened when housing shortages forced schools across the country to provide living quarters for married, older, and foreign students. A-V was cheap, no-frills, not air-conditioned, brick apartments for $50–60 per month. The complex had childcare, playgrounds, tennis courts and picnic tables. Officially, the complex was Alumni Memorial Village because the street names were those of FSU graduates who recently died.
	Burt Reynolds Hall	215 HAYDEN RD	WEST	30.439602 -84.306953	1968–2025	240	The 60-unit, three building complex across from the stadium was constructed in 1968 as college apartments. Seminole Boosters purchased it as a dormitory for the football team. Although Burt Reynolds did not pay for the building, Seminole Boosters named it in his honor at its dedication in 1987. It remained an athletic dorm until exclusive athletic dorms were banned by the NCAA in 1995. It became general student housing that year. The dorm was demolished in September 2025 to become a 1.83 acre parking lot, ironic considering parking was always a problem at the dorm.
	Degraff Hall Old	808 W TENNESSEE ST	EAST	30.445157 -84.294477	1950–2005	3??	Senior Hall was the original name. It was designed by architect Robert Fitch Smith and dedicated in 1961 to Dr. Mark H. DeGraff, a professor of education. With large windows and patios, it was considered luxurious compared to other dormitories.
	Deviney Hall Old	111 S WOODWARD AVE	WEST	30.440973 -84.297088	1952–2014	999	Seven stories with communal bathrooms, The original Deviney Hall was designed by Guy Fulton. It honored Ezda May Deviney, Zoology Professor at FSCW for 33 years. A newly constructed Deviney Hall replaced it in 2015.
	Dorman Hall Old	101 S WOODWARD AVE	WEST	30.440905 -84.297029	1959–2015	250	Eight stories, 125 rooms with communal bathrooms. Named for Dr. Olivia Dorman, a classics professor and dean in the 1930s, it was demolished in 2015.
	Kellum Hall	74 CHIEFTAN WAY	EAST	30.440567 -84.295019	1959–2015	564	Eleven stories, 282 rooms with communal bathrooms. Designed by architect Guy Fulton, named for John Gabriel Kellum, FSCW Business Manager 1907–1945.
	Magnolia Hall Old	MAGNOLIA WAY	EAST	30.440567 -84.295019	1944–1979	154	After an emergency exemption from the War Production Board, Magnolia Hall was built in 1944 and intended to house 154 students. Constructed of concrete blocks, it was the most fireproof building on campus. Although the structure was considered temporary, it was in use until July, 1979.
	Smith Hall	78 CHIEFTAN WAY	EAST	30.440567 -84.295019	1953–2016	551	Ten stories, 275 rooms with communal bathrooms. Designed by architects from Bail, Horton & Associates, named for Elmer Riggs Smith, who headed the math department at FSCW for 39 years and was also an FSU Football assistant coach in 1904.

== See also ==
- Florida State University
- History of Florida State University
- List of buildings at Florida State University
