= Legacy Hall =

Business building at FSU

- Interactive map of the Legacy Hall area

General information
- Type: Office; Auditorium; Classroom
- Architectural style: Collegiate Gothic
- Location: 402 West Gaines Street, Tallahassee, Florida 32306
- Coordinates: 30.4363924°N 84.2871355°W ,
- Named for: numerous
- Completed: 2025

Design and construction
- Architect: Goody Clancy
- Main contractor: Culpepper Construction

Website
- Legacy Hall

Legacy Hall is the largest academic space on the campus of Florida State University in Tallahassee, in the U.S. state of Florida. The building houses the College of Business and was constructed in the Collegiate Gothic style of architecture prevalent on the campus.

== History ==
Legacy Hall replaced Rovetta Business Building A, which was originally constructed in 1958 when enrollment at the FSU College of Business was 800. An annex to Rovetta was added in 1984, when enrollment was 3,000. Nearly 40 years later, there are 6,346 undergrads and graduate students. Compared to Rovetta, the new building will provide a 55% increase for students; a 24% increase for faculty; and a 21% increase for staff. The name Legacy was chosen because every student, alumni, faculty, staff and friend plays a role in leaving their own mark on the history of FSU's College of Business.

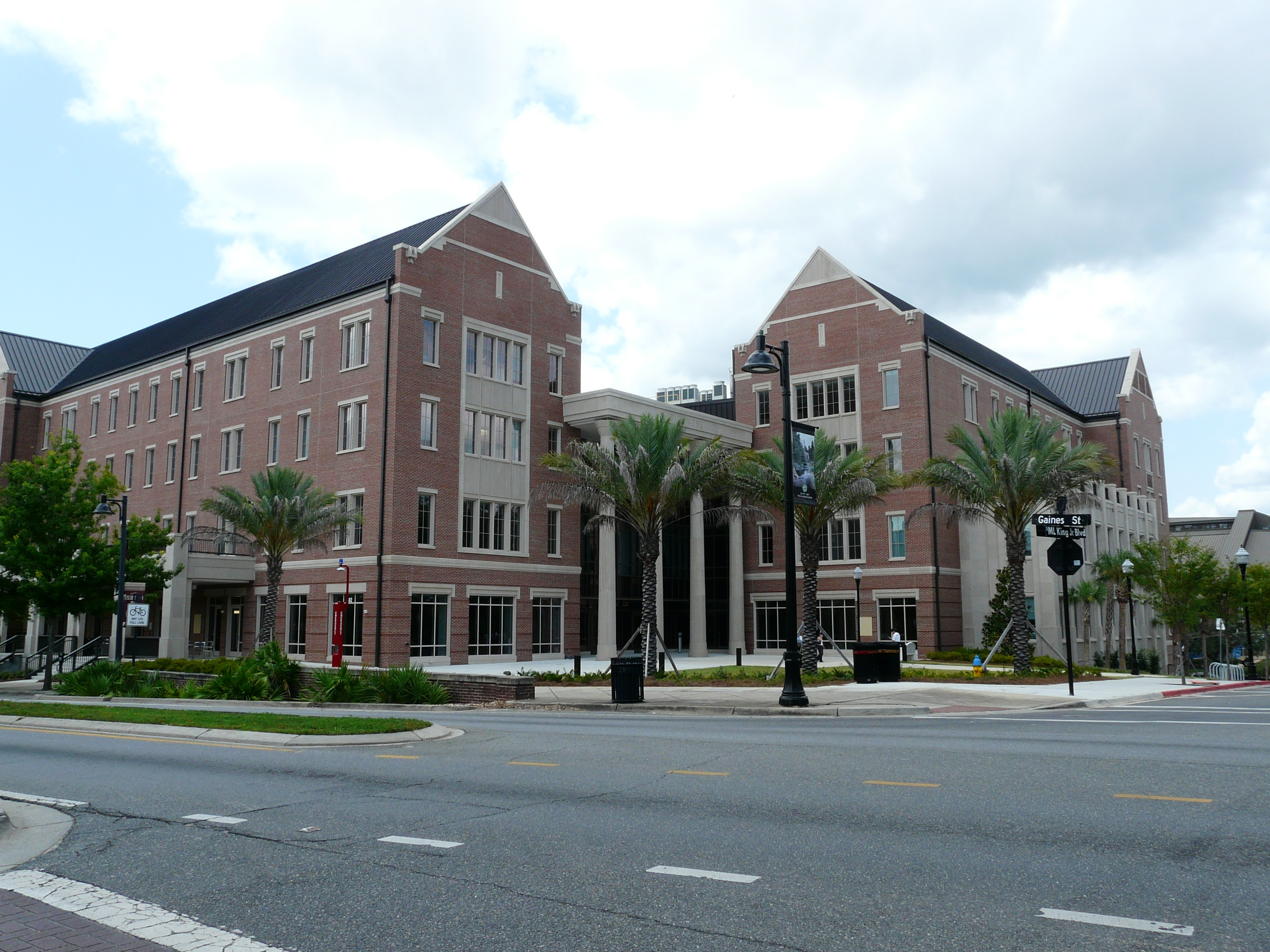
Legacy Hall

== Plans ==
Legacy Hall was a top legislative priority for FSU when it was announced in 2018 as the largest academic space on FSU's campus, an $88 million, 218,392 sq ft (20,289.3 m^{2}) structure for the College of Business. It is located in the Arena District directly south of the Donald L. Tucker Civic Center. The five stories contain a central atrium, a 300-seat auditorium, forum stairs with seating, multipurpose event space and other facilities. There will be dedicated space for the college's ten institutes and centers.

Governor Ron DeSantis approved legislation providing $44 million in funding, and an additional amount was donated by alumni and supporters in the form of naming opportunities for classrooms, offices, suites, and floors. Contributions ranged from $15,000 to $5 million. The COVID-19 pandemic delayed the start of construction, which was originally projected to begin in 2019 and open in the fall of 2021.

== Groundbreaking ==
Groundbreaking for Legacy Hall occurred on Friday, October 14, 2022. The structure was expected to become the center of business education, development and collaboration at FSU, the capitol and Florida.

Due to the pandemic delay and a dramatic rise in construction materials, the estimated price including brick-and-mortar, furnishings and technology rose to $160 million. Following a 24-month construction phase the building was now expected to be completed in August 2025 with the first classes planned for January 2026.

== Ribbon-cutting ==
A donation from Dr. Herbert Wertheim of $65 million enabled completion of the Herbert Wertheim Center for Business Excellence. A ceremony and building tours were held on Tuesday, January 6th, 2026.

== See also ==
- Florida State University
- History of Florida State University
