= Florida A&M University – Florida State University College of Engineering =

Engineering college in Tallahassee, Florida, US

FAMU–FSU College of Engineering
- Type: Engineering school
- Established: 1982
- Affiliations: Florida State University; Florida A&M University
- Dean: Suvranu De
- Students: 2,584 total 2,268 (FSU); 316 (FAMU)
- Location: Tallahassee, Florida, U.S. 30°25′13″N 84°19′4″W
- Website: www.eng.famu.fsu.edu

The FAMU-FSU College of Engineering is the joint college of engineering of Florida A&M University and Florida State University, the only such joint college of its kind in the United States. The joint college was established as a joint program serving two universities in Tallahassee, Florida: The Florida Agricultural and Mechanical University, which received recognition from the National Academy of Sciences and the National Academy of Engineering in 2010 for ranking number one as the institution of origin for African Americans earning Doctorates in Natural Science and Engineering; and, Florida State University which has gained worldwide recognition for its extensive graduate and research programs. The college is located less than three miles from either university.

As of 2024, the school enrolls about 3,050 undergraduates and graduate students, including Master of Science, Master of Engineering, and Ph.D.-seeking students. Approximately 85% of these students attend FSU and 15% attend FAMU, which equates to roughly 23% of the student bodies at both universities. The college operates from a 200,000-square-foot (19,000 m^{2}) complex of buildings next to Innovation Park in Tallahassee.

All programs are accredited by the Engineering Accreditation Commission of the ABET and the Southern Association of Colleges and Schools (SACS).

== History ==
In 1959, the physics department at Florida State University (FSU) created the Department of Engineering Science. When a downturn in engineering jobs nationally, felt especially in the Florida aerospace sector with the downscaling of Project Apollo and the rest of NASA's crewed space program in Central Florida, policy decisions were made at both an FSU leadership level and a state political level that led to a 1972 decision to disestablish the engineering school at FSU and relinquish undergraduate and postgraduate engineering education in Florida's public state universities to the University of Florida, the University of South Florida, and Florida Technological University (later renamed the University of Central Florida) while still maintaining programs in mathematics, chemistry and physics at FSU.

In 1976, Florida A&M University (FAMU) established a new College of Science and Technology with a division of industrial and engineering technology. The university has since reorganized these programs under its School of Architecture and Engineering Technology.

In April, 1982, the shared FAMU/FSU Institute for Engineering gets approved by the Board of Regents with Dr. Joe Lannutti and Dr. Charles Kidd appointed as co-directors. August 30, 1982 was the first day of the first semester at the Institute: 3 engineering courses at FSU and 2 at FAMU. Both universities could now produce professional engineers with an accredited Bachelor of Science in Engineering.

The 122,159 sq. ft. Phase I Building for the joint college was completed and occupied in 1988. That year, enrollment at the college exceeded 1000. In 1993, the first PhD degree was awarded and enrollment officially passed 2,000. In 1998, the 98,004 sq. ft. Phase II Building was completed and occupied.

== Research ==
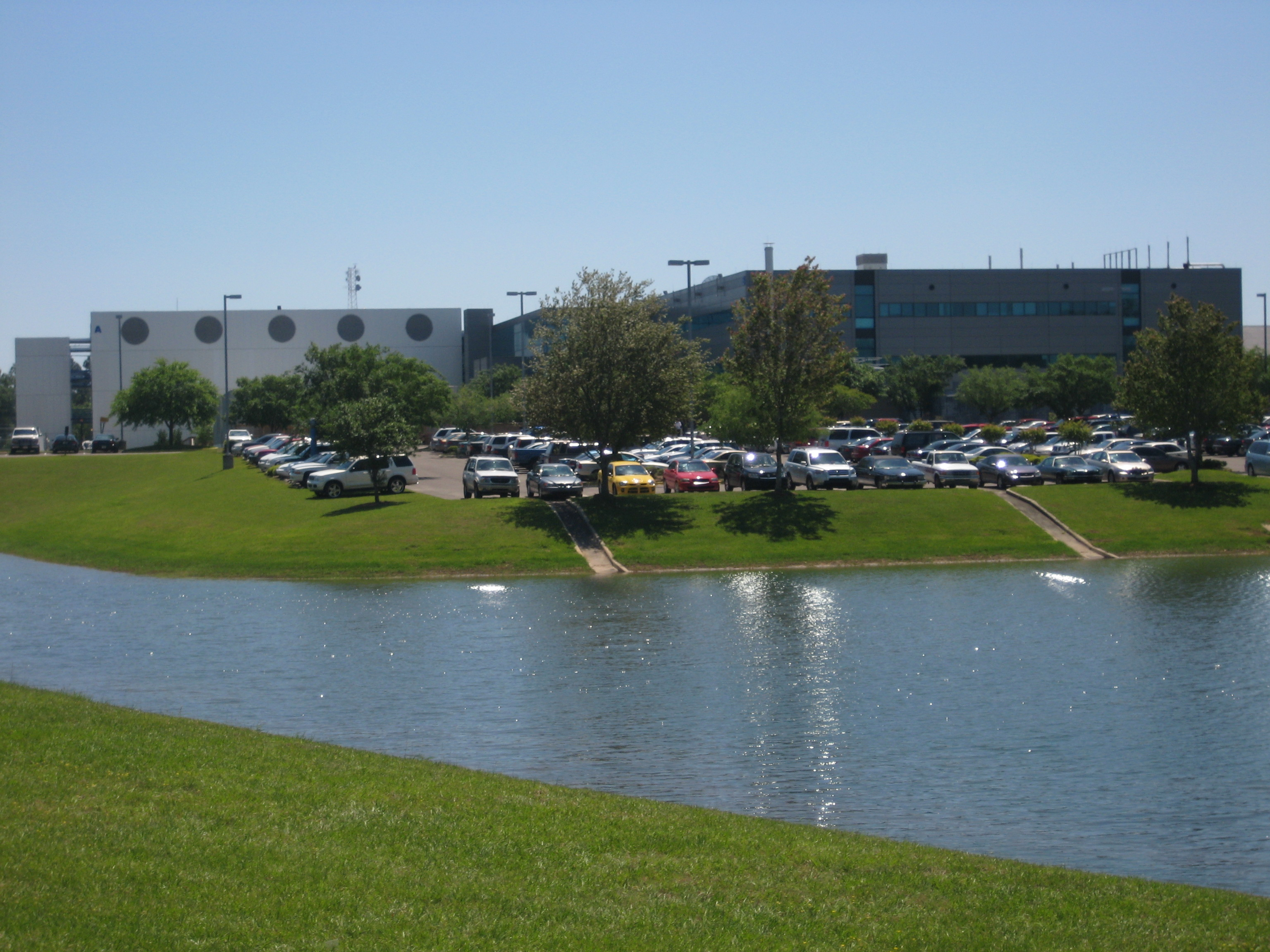
The College of Engineering complex

In 2023, the College of Engineering had annual research expenditures of more than $43 million. The research productivity at the College of Engineering provides opportunities for more than 300 graduate students to conduct their research.

In 2007, Florida State University announced the construction of a Materials Research Building near the College of Engineering.

The College of Engineering also operates a Challenger Learning Center in downtown Tallahassee, with a planetarium and IMAX theater. This project was cosponsored by NASA.

== Departments, schools, and programs ==
- Department of Chemical & Biomedical Engineering
- Department of Civil & Environmental Engineering
- Department of Electrical & Computer Engineering
- Department of Industrial & Manufacturing Engineering
- Department of Mechanical Engineering
- Department of Materials Science & Engineering

== Research centers, institutes and labs ==
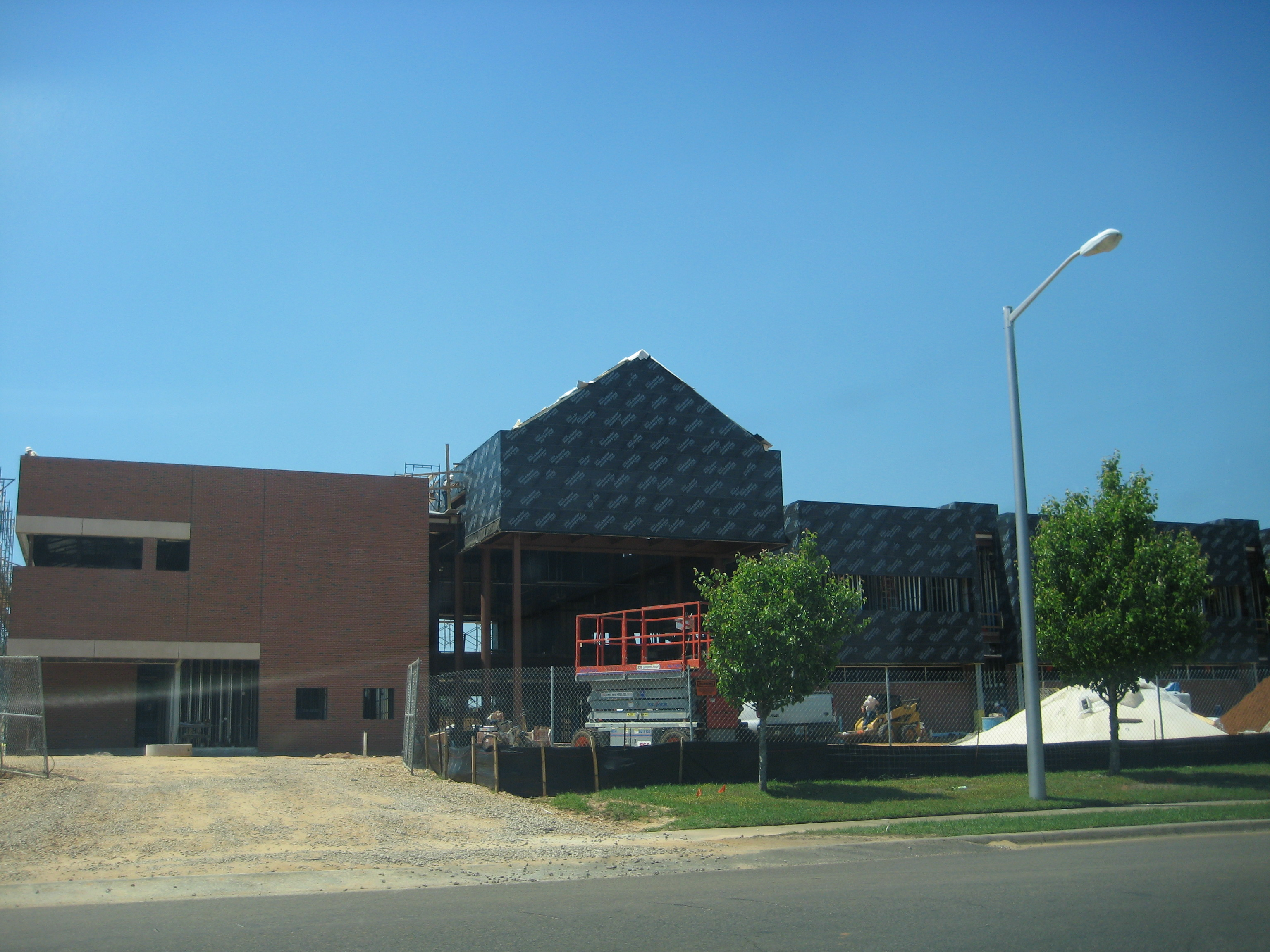
FSU's High-Performance Materials Institute opened in 2008.

- Aero-Propulsion, Mechatronics and Energy Center (AME) at FSU
- Applied Superconductivity Center (ASC)
- Center for Accessibility and Safety for an Aging Population (ASAP)
- Center for Advanced Power Systems (CAPS) at FSU
- Center for Intelligent Systems, Control, and Robotics (CISCOR)
- Crashworthiness & Impact Analysis Laboratory (CIAL)
- Energy Research at College of Engineering
- Energy and Sustainability Center (ESC) at FSU
- Florida Advanced Center for Composite Technologies (FAC2T), which became Florida’s first National Science Foundation Industry/University Cooperative Research Center (I/UCRC)
- Florida Center for Advanced Aero-Propulsion (FCAAP)
- High-Performance Materials Institute (HPMI) at FSU
- National High Magnetic Field Laboratory (NHMFL)
- Resilient Infrastructure & Disaster Response Center (RIDER)
- Rural Equitable and Accessible Transportation Center (REAT)

== National rankings ==
U.S. News & World Report (2015 edition)

Department	Ranking
Overall College of Engineering	102nd overall in the United States
Chemical Engineering	102nd overall
Civil Engineering	NR overall
Computer Engineering	102nd overall
Environmental Engineering	NR overall
Industrial Engineering	65th overall
Mechanical Engineering	88th overall
Electrical Engineering	102nd overall
Biomedical Engineering	NR overall
Manufacturing Engineering	65th overall
