= Innovation Park (Tallahassee) =

Coordinates: 30.426°N 84.323°W

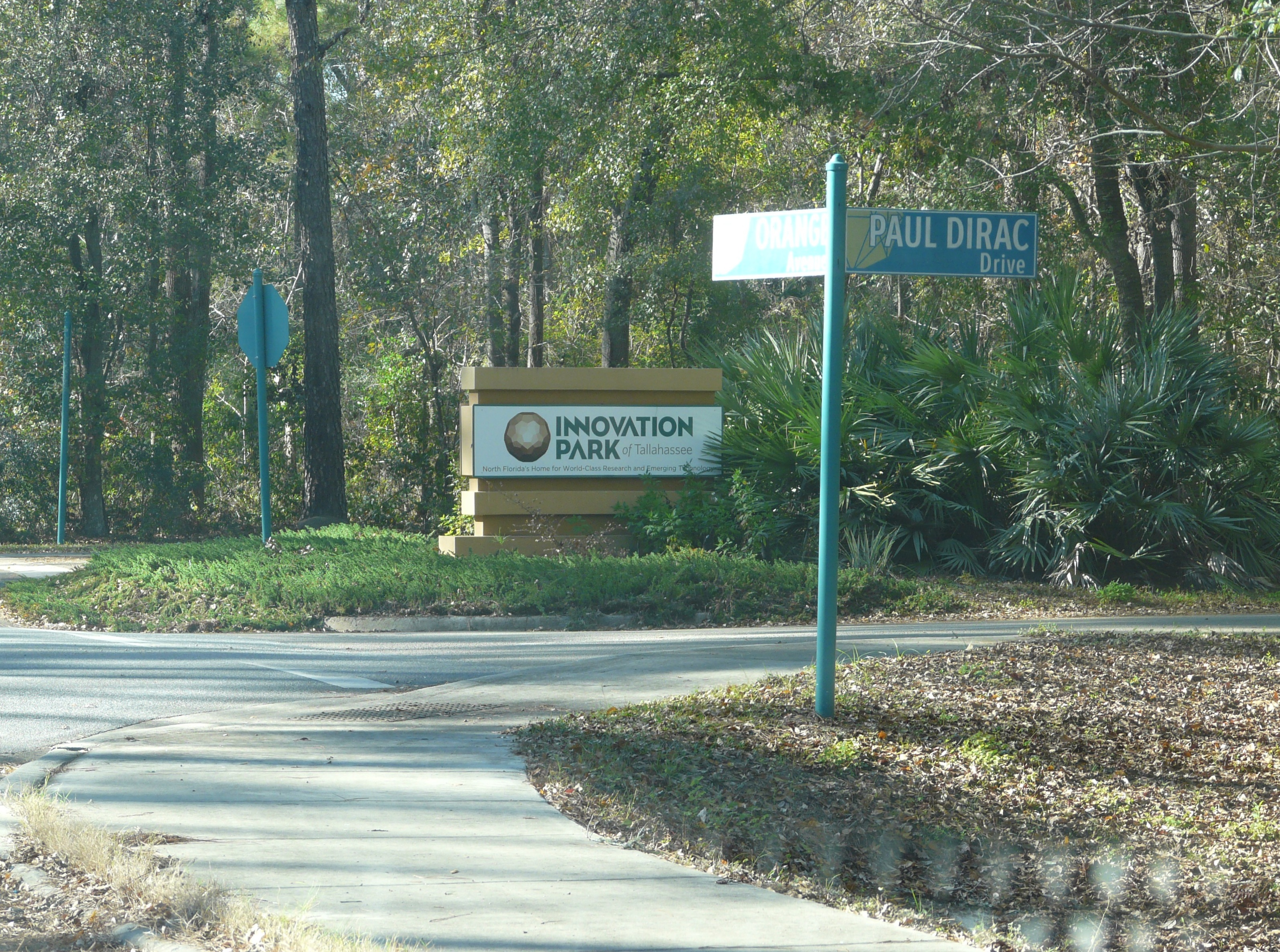
Park entrance on Orange Avenue

Innovation Park is the location of the National High Magnetic Field Laboratory, the Applied Superconductivity Center, Danfoss Turbocor and related advanced research facilities. The Leon County Research and Development Authority's Innovation Park is located near the campuses of Florida State University, Florida A&M University and Tallahassee Community College in Tallahassee, Florida.

Innovation Park is located slightly southwest of downtown Tallahassee.

== The Park ==
Innovation Park was created in 1978 and is overseen by the Leon County Research and Development Authority (The Authority) The Authority is governed by a Board of Governors composed of prominent academic, business and community leaders who work together to facilitate growth and development of research into high-tech businesses in Innovation Park. There are currently 1900 jobs in Innovation Park.

Sitting on 208 acres of woods, Innovation Park features 17 buildings; 9 of which are owned by Florida State University, 1 is owned by Florida A&M University and The Authority owns 5. The other buildings are privately owned. The research park also includes the Florida A&M University Small business development center, which assists entrepreneurs from the beginning stages of the growth of their dream. From evaluating business ideas, to developing a business plan, to exploring financing options, the Small Business development center is a strategic partner, from step one, all the way up the ladder of success. Innovation Park sits next to the FAMU-FSU College of Engineering. However, no classrooms are permitted on Innovation Park property. The park currently has 7.3 acres of undeveloped land that can be leased for development.

The Research Park is located in Leon County, where there are several business incentives being offered, as well as grants and scholarships.

== Partnerships ==
The Leon County Research and Development Authority works in partnership with Florida State University, Florida A&M University, Tallahassee Community College, as well as governmental and industrial sector representatives.

== Notable Tenants ==
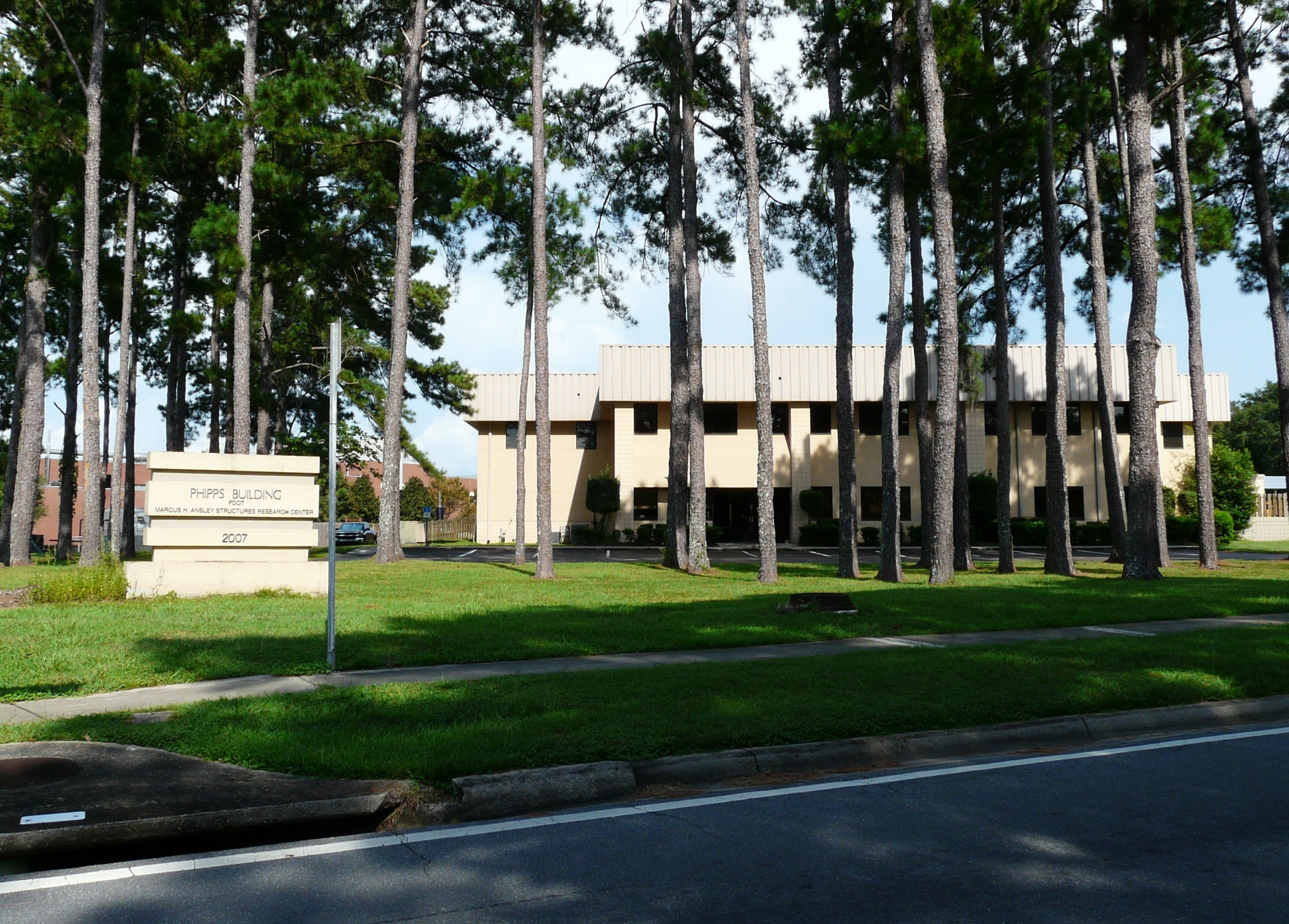
The FDOT Phipps Building

- National High Magnetic Field Laboratory
- FSU Center for Advanced Power Systems (CAPS)
- FSU Center for Ocean-Atmospheric Prediction Studies (COAPS)
- Aeropropulsion Mechatronics and Energy Center (AME) (Martin Collier Phillips)
- High Performance Materials Institute (HPMI)
- FAMU Center for Plasma Science and Technology
- Danfoss Turbocor Compressors
- Florida Virtual Campus
- FSU Enterprise Resource Planning
- National Park Service Southeast Archaeological Center
- Florida Department of Transportation Structural Research Center
- Small Business Development Center at FAMU
