= Fair Game (Homeland) =

- Homeland episode
- Episode no.: Season 6 Episode 1
- Directed by: Keith Gordon
- Written by: Alex Gansa; Ted Mann
- Production code: 6WAH01
- Original air date: January 15, 2017
- Running time: 51 minutes

Guest appearances
- Hill Harper as Rob Emmons; Robert Knepper as General Jamie McClendon; Dominic Fumusa as Ray Conlin; Patrick Sabongui as Reda Hashem; Hadar Ratzon-Rotem as Tovah Rivlin; Zainab Jah as Mrs. Bah; J. Mallory McCree as Sekou Bah; Ashlei Sharpe Chestnut as Simone Bah; Leo Manzari as Saad; Alfredo Narciso as Elian Coto; Mickey O'Hagan as Clarice; Bobby Moreno as Tommy; Sebastian Koch as Otto Düring

Episode chronology
← Previous "A False Glimmer"	Next → "The Man in the Basement"
- Homeland season 6

"Fair Game" is the season premiere of the sixth season of the American television drama series Homeland, and the 61st episode overall. It premiered on Showtime on January 15, 2017.

== Plot ==
Sekou Bah (J. Mallory McCree), a young black Muslim-American, posts a series of videos online where he visits locations of past domestic terrorist attacks and chronicles what happened. He is arrested by FBI Special Agent Ray Conlin (Dominic Fumusa) and charged with materially supporting terrorism. Carrie (Claire Danes), now heading up a non-profit organization in New York City that defends the rights of Muslim-Americans against discrimination, meets Sekou and prepares to represent him. Conlin reveals to Carrie that they found Sekou in possession of plane tickets to Nigeria, the base of operations of Boko Haram, and $5,000 in cash hidden under his mattress.

Carrie visits Peter Quinn (Rupert Friend) at a veteran's hospital where he is rehabilitating from his exposure to sarin gas in Berlin. Quinn exhibits signs of PTSD and partial paralysis. They get into an argument when Carrie learns that Quinn skipped a physical therapy appointment. When Quinn is reported missing the next day, Carrie tracks him down to a brothel where he has been smoking crack and having sex with prostitutes, and finds him with a head wound after being mugged for his government check. When Quinn violently resists being readmitted to the hospital, Carrie reluctantly agrees to let him stay with her and Franny, albeit in her downstairs apartment.

Saul Berenson (Mandy Patinkin) and Dar Adal (F. Murray Abraham) brief President-elect Elizabeth Keane (Elizabeth Marvel) on ongoing CIA operations. After the briefing, Dar expresses concern to Saul that Keane might be planning to demilitarize the CIA, noting that Keane's son was killed while serving in Iraq. Saul is more amenable to Keane's point of view. Dar covertly meets Tovah Rivlin (Hadar Ratzon-Rotem) of Mossad and suggests that certain initiatives should be accelerated before Keane's inauguration, only eight weeks away. As the episode concludes, Dar Adal hosts a meeting with General McClendon (Robert Knepper), Senator Coto (Alfredo Narciso) and other officials. Dar and Coto have decided not to include Saul.

== Production ==
The episode was directed by Keith Gordon, and co-written by showrunner Alex Gansa and co-executive producer Ted Mann.

== Reception ==
=== Reviews ===
The episode received a rating of 100% with an average score of 7.2 out of 10 on the review aggregator Rotten Tomatoes, with the site's consensus stating "Although Homeland's premiere episode lacks the show's signature thrills and gimmicks, 'Fair Game' effectively sets the table for future improvement, establishing a powerful sense of time and place and nuanced character moments throughout."

Brian Tallerico of New York Magazine rated the episode 4 out of 5 stars, saying it had "a pleasantly slow pace... it's an interesting tone-setter for a show that can often be detrimentally hyperactive". In praise of the episode's scenery, Tallerico wrote "The premiere used New York City beautifully, especially in the bustling background behind Sekou's videos" Matt Brennan of Paste called the episode "uneventful", but stated: "despite its dearth of narrative fireworks, tonight’s episode succeeds in setting the table for such developments on two distinct fronts".

Joshua Alston of The A.V. Club, giving the episode a B−, was less positive, calling it an "underwhelming first impression" and writing, "'Fair Game' is boring. It’s not only boring by Homeland standards, thriller standards, or premium cable drama standards. It’s just plain boring, full stop."

Rupert Friend was named "Performer of the Week" by TVLine for his performance; they wrote "it’s a credit to Friend’s raw, riveting performance that he’s making Quinn’s descent so authentic—and tragic".

=== Ratings ===
The original broadcast drew 1.1 million viewers. In addition, 1.25 million people watched the premiere in advance via Showtime's on-demand services.
