= The Covenant (Homeland) =

- Homeland episode
- Episode no.: Season 6 Episode 3
- Directed by: Lesli Linka Glatter
- Written by: Ron Nyswaner
- Production code: 6WAH03
- Original air date: January 29, 2017
- Running time: 50 minutes

Guest appearances
- Hill Harper as Rob Emmons; Dominic Fumusa as Ray Conlin; Patrick Sabongui as Reda Hashem; C.J. Wilson as Porteous Belli; J. Mallory McCree as Sekou Bah; Bernard White as Farhad Nafisi; Jacqueline Antaramian as Dorit; Mickey O'Hagan as Clarice; Hadar Ratzon-Rotem as Tovah Rivlin; Ian Kahn as Roger; Bobby Moreno as Tommy; Natacha Karam as Mina Becker; Leo Manzari as Saad; James Mount as Agent Thoms

Episode chronology
← Previous "The Man in the Basement"	Next → "A Flash of Light"
- Homeland season 6

"The Covenant" is the third episode of the sixth season of the American television drama series Homeland, and the 63rd episode overall. It premiered on Showtime on January 29, 2017.

== Plot ==
Carrie (Claire Danes) breaks the news to Sekou (J. Mallory McCree) that the plea offer was revoked, due to Carrie's having conferred with Saad. Carrie reaches out to Roger (Ian Kahn), an ex-contact of hers, and asks him to obtain a recording of a particular phone conversation between Saad and Conlin (Dominic Fumusa). The recording confirms that Conlin was trying to entrap the innocent Sekou. Carrie goes to Conlin with the evidence, threatening to send it to the attorney general unless Conlin drops all charges against Sekou.

Saul (Mandy Patinkin) arrives in Abu Dhabi to interrogate Farhad Nafisi (Bernard White). Saul confronts Nafisi with financial records obtained from his phone showing a large transfer of funds from a covert account. Nafisi denies any involvement with North Korea, making a convincing case that during his recent travels, he was merely buying Russian anti-aircraft equipment. Saul is convinced Nafisi is lying, deducing that there is no reason for Nafisi to utilize a covert account to make a legal purchase of anti-aircraft guns, but gets nothing actionable from the interrogation; he reports this to Dar (F. Murray Abraham). However, Dar tells President-elect Keane (Elizabeth Marvel) during a briefing that Saul was able to confirm Iran's parallel nuclear program, calling the evidence "conclusive." Carrie meets Keane later and is immediately skeptical of Dar's report. As they speak, Dar is shown to be listening to a live feed of their conversation. Saul leaves Abu Dhabi and travels to The West Bank to meet his sister, whilst there he also arranges a rendezvous and is picked up by someone at night, though it is not clear by whom.

Quinn (Rupert Friend) grows increasingly paranoid that someone is invading Carrie's apartment. He contacts Clarice (Mickey O'Hagan) so she can lead him to Tommy (Bobby Moreno), the man who mugged Quinn. Quinn assaults Tommy and takes his gun, calling it payback for the money stolen from him. Now armed, Quinn lurks outside of Carrie's apartment with his gun drawn.

== Production ==
The episode was directed by executive producer Lesli Linka Glatter and written by co-executive producer Ron Nyswaner.

== Reception ==
=== Reviews ===
The episode received a rating of 70% with an average score of 6.44 out of 10 on the review aggregator Rotten Tomatoes, with the site's consensus stating "'The Covenant' moves slow and pushes little plot forward, yet strong character moments and a growing conflict between Dar and Carrie appear to be setting the table for an explosive showdown."

Brian Tallerico of Vulture gave the episode 3 out of 5 stars, calling it "a remarkably thin episode for this often-thick series" and finding it "almost startling how little distance the plot is pushed." However, he praised the "gravity" of Mandy Patinkin's performance. Judith Warner of The New York Times found the pace of the episode "a bit too slow" and "a bit tiresome", taking issue with the incongruence between Carrie's civilian life and "the raw, desperate thrill of her old existence in the C.I.A.", feeling it presented the same "normal-person issue" as her life in the previous season. Joshua Alston of The A.V. Club gave the episode a C, writing that the episode "might go down in history as Homeland’s least compelling hour ever." He called the episode "meandering" and "dull" and, like Warner, criticized the depiction of Carrie's new life as "kind of a drag", but praised Lesli Linka Glatter's "beautiful" direction of the opening scene depicting Quinn's nightmare.

=== Ratings ===
The original broadcast was watched by 1.13 million viewers.
