= Tomas Vengris =

Lithuanian-American film director and editor

Tomas Vengris (born 1984) is a Lithuanian-American film director and editor.

Tomas Vengris is a first-generation American. He received B.A. in political science from Columbia University, then studied photography and video art at the Vilnius Academy of Arts, and received a master's degree in directing from the American Film Institute, Los Angeles, United States.

== Filmography ==
- 2012: Kalifornija, AFI graduation film
- 2015: Squirrel, short fiction, 7 min.
- 2016: Kicks''; editing, a full feature film
- 2019: Motherland; coproduction of Lithuania’s Studio Uljana Kim and Latvia’s Locomotive Productions together with German outfit Heimathafen Film and Greece’s Faliro House (Lithuanian: Gimtinė), feature film
- 2023: Five and a Half Love Stories in a Vilnius Apartment
- 2024: Jungleland, editing

== Filmography awards ==
- 2021: Audience Award at the ArteKino Festival for Motherland
- Five and a Half Love Stories in a Vilnius Apartment
  - 2023: "Rebels With a Cause" program Best Film award at the Tallinn film festival "Black Nights"
  - 2024: Sidabrinė gervė 2024: the film was nominated in several categories, and Hadar Ratzon-Rotem won the "Best Supporting Actress" award.
