= Casus Belli (Homeland) =

- Homeland episode
- Episode no.: Season 6 Episode 5
- Directed by: Alex Graves
- Written by: Chip Johannessen
- Production code: 6WAH05
- Original air date: February 19, 2017
- Running time: 46 minutes

Guest appearances
- Hill Harper as Rob Emmons; Patrick Sabongui as Reda Hashem; Dominic Fumusa as Ray Conlin; Jake Weber as Brett O’Keefe; Ian Kahn as Roger; Deborah Hedwall as Marjorie; Zainab Jah as Mrs. Bah; Ashlei Sharpe Chestnut as Simone Bah; James Mount as Agent Thoms; Robert Bogue as ESU Captain Wilson

Episode chronology
← Previous "A Flash of Light"	Next → "The Return"
- Homeland season 6

"Casus Belli" is the fifth episode of the sixth season of the American television drama series Homeland, and the 65th episode overall. It premiered on Showtime on February 19, 2017.

== Plot ==
Sekou (J. Mallory McCree) is publicly identified as the driver of the Medina Medley van that exploded in New York. Carrie (Claire Danes), having to attend to Sekou's family, leaves Quinn (Rupert Friend) to watch her daughter until babysitter Latisha arrives. Word gets out that Carrie was the legal assistant who negotiated Sekou's release, and a large crowd of reporters and angry protesters gather outside Carrie's apartment. A female reporter approaches the front door for an interview. Quinn forcefully takes the reporter inside the house, harshly questions her, and throws her out down the front steps, inciting the mob further. Protesters start throwing rocks at the apartment; Quinn shoots one of them in the shoulder. Latisha has arrived amidst the chaos. She wants to leave with Franny but Quinn does not let her. The NYPD surround the apartment and treat it as a hostage situation. Carrie runs into Conlin (Dominic Fumusa) who demands to know where she got the telephone recording, which Carrie does not divulge. Carrie then finds Roger (Ian Kahn) to warn him of an imminent investigation, but Roger insists he was not the one who sent Carrie the recording.

President-elect Keane (Elizabeth Marvel) is taken to a safe house by her Secret Service detail, led by Agent Thoms (James Mount). She grows frustrated throughout the day as she is given no functioning TV, and finds phone communication with any of her staff to be near impossible. After briefing Keane, Dar (F. Murray Abraham) picks up Saul (Mandy Patinkin) at the airport. Saul explains how he found a discarded box of Nafisi's cigarettes in a surveillance room that Nafisi should never have been in, and speculates that the interview with Nafisi might have been a setup, orchestrated by Mossad.

An ESU squad attempts to enter Carrie's apartment, but Quinn disarms the first officer who gets in, forcing them to abort entry. Carrie, having been told of the situation by Conlin, returns home and tries to explain the situation to the police. She is allowed to enter to try and talk Quinn down. Quinn attempts to explain to Carrie that he has proof on his phone that Carrie has been spied on, and that is why the police will not let him go free. As they are talking, ESU storms the apartment. Carrie tackles Quinn and shields him from possible harm. Quinn is taken into police custody without further incident. Later on, Carrie finds Quinn's phone and, looking through his photos, sees the photos of the mysterious man across the street and his trip to the Medina Medley facility. She looks across the street and sees someone looking back through their blinds.

== Production ==
The episode was directed by Alex Graves and written by executive producer Chip Johannessen. The title refers to the Latin term casus belli meaning "act of war." "Casus belli" is also Turkish for "the spy is known".

== Reception ==
=== Reviews ===
The episode received a rating of 100% with an average score of 8.23 out of 10 on the review aggregator Rotten Tomatoes, with the site's consensus stating "Tense, emotional, and reminiscent of earlier Homeland episodes, 'Casus Belli' returns its leading lady to the tense, high-stakes storytelling in which she truly thrives.".

Shirley Li of Entertainment Weekly gave the episode a B+ grade, summarizing with "it's a solid episode, planting the seeds for the latter half of the season and raising intriguing questions". Brian Tallerico of New York Magazine rated the episode 4 out of 5 stars. While having reservations about how quickly the situation escalated with the Quinn standoff, Tallerico praised the performance of Rupert Friend and said the scenes there were "tense and really well-shot".

=== Ratings ===
The original broadcast was watched by 1.07 million viewers.
