= The Man in the Basement =

- Homeland episode
- Episode no.: Season 6 Episode 2
- Directed by: Keith Gordon
- Written by: Chip Johannessen
- Production code: 6WAH02
- Original air date: January 22, 2017
- Running time: 56 minutes

Guest appearances
- Maury Sterling as Max; Hill Harper as Rob Emmons; Dominic Fumusa as Ray Conlin; Patrick Sabongui as Reda Hashem; C.J. Wilson as Porteous Belli; Zainab Jah as Mrs. Bah; J. Mallory McCree as Sekou Bah; Ashlei Sharpe Chestnut as Simone Bah; Leo Manzari as Saad

Episode chronology
← Previous "Fair Game"	Next → "The Covenant"
- Homeland season 6

"The Man in the Basement" is the second episode of the sixth season of the American television drama series Homeland, and the 62nd episode overall. It premiered on Showtime on January 22, 2017.

== Plot ==
Carrie (Claire Danes) and Reda (Patrick Sabongui) consult Sekou (J. Mallory McCree), asking about the $5,000 under his mattress. Sekou claims that it was a loan from his friend Saad (Leo Manzari) so that he could visit his father in Nigeria, though Saad did want Sekou to also have a meeting with an unidentified party in return. At Carrie's request, Max (Maury Sterling) looks into Saad's background and deduces that Saad is actually an informant for the FBI. The court doesn't allow Carrie and Reda any access to Saad, so Carrie tracks down Saad herself and confronts him. Saad admits that he was a gang member who turned informant when arrested, and that his handler, Special Agent Conlin (Dominic Fumusa), had him strike up a relationship with Sekou and offer him the money. Saad stresses that he reported back to Conlin that Sekou was not in any way supporting terrorists.

Dar Adal (F. Murray Abraham) has a sitdown with the President-elect's chief of staff Rob Emmons (Hill Harper). According to Dar, the CIA believes that Iran is assembling an underground nuclear program with the help of North Korea, and that Israel plans to apprehend Iran's liaison, Farhad Nafisi, when he makes a scheduled trip to Abu Dhabi. Saul (Mandy Patinkin) visits Carrie and accuses her of being an advisor to President-elect Keane (Elizabeth Marvel), noting that Keane's views on foreign policy are very reminiscent of Carrie's. Carrie denies it, but later, she is asked and indeed does meet with Keane and Emmons. After being apprised of the situation with Iran, Carrie proposes that Saul be the one to represent the U.S. in Abu Dhabi and talk to Nafisi. Dar Adal obtains photos of Carrie going to see Keane, but opts not to show them to Saul.

Quinn (Rupert Friend) refuses to take his medication; as a result, he has a seizure while shopping at the nearby store. When Carrie returns home, Quinn asks to be shown the video of him being exposed to sarin gas, claiming to have no memory of the incident. Carrie shows Quinn the video and recounts how she used the footage to save his life. Quinn responds "Why?", to which Carrie breaks into tears and repeatedly says "I'm sorry", leaving Quinn confused.

== Production ==
The episode was directed by Keith Gordon and written by executive producer Chip Johannessen.

== Reception ==
=== Reviews ===
The episode received a rating of 100% with an average score of 7.74 out of 10 on the review aggregator Rotten Tomatoes, with the site's consensus stating "'The Man in the Basement' boasts grounded performances and political commentary as a setup for a potential epic showdown."

Lead actors Claire Danes and Rupert Friend were highlighted by critics for their performances. IndieWire's Ben Travers gave the episode a 'B+' grade, and said of Friend "this week’s performance continued to build Quinn’s new, damaged psyche" and "His physical alterations... exemplify a performance that’s precise rather than manic; a distinguishing factor when an actor can go big with his character, and instead hones [sic] in on the little changes that make a monumental difference". The Baltimore Sun's Ethan Renner wrote "I've thought for a long time that Claire Danes is the best actress on television, and she showed why again here, turning average material into a great performance".

Joshua Alston of The A.V. Club opined that the episode should have been released back-to-back with the season premiere, stating that "'The Man in the Basement' makes a far stronger case for giving yet another Homeland demi-reboot time to reveal its hand," and that the episode "works much better than the first on a scene-by-scene basis." He too praised Friend's "terrific work" but wrote that the Quinn storyline is "heartbreaking and effective, but doesn’t represent the version of Homeland I most enjoy watching."

=== Ratings ===
The original broadcast was watched by 1.45 million viewers.
