= A Flash of Light =

A Flash of Light may refer to:

- A Flash of Light (film)
- A Flash of Light (Homeland)
- Shinkirari, the Japanese name of the manga series Talk to My Back
