= The Return (Homeland) =

- Homeland episode
- Episode no.: Season 6 Episode 6
- Directed by: Alex Graves
- Written by: Charlotte Stoudt
- Production code: 6WAH06
- Original air date: February 26, 2017
- Running time: 49 minutes

Guest appearances
- Maury Sterling as Max; Hill Harper as Rob Emmons; Dominic Fumusa as Ray Conlin; C.J. Wilson as Porteous Belli; Rachel Ticotin as Mercedes Acosta; Deborah Hedwall as Marjorie; Alan Dale as President Morse; Leo Manzari as Saad; Seth Numrich as Nate Joseph; James Mount as Agent Thoms; Ronald Guttman as Viktor; Roberto De Felice; Neal Matarazzo; Nina Hoss as Astrid

Episode chronology
← Previous "Casus Belli"	Next → "Imminent Risk"
- Homeland season 6

"The Return" is the sixth episode of the sixth season of the American television drama series Homeland, and the 66th episode overall. It premiered on Showtime on February 26, 2017.

== Plot ==
Carrie (Claire Danes) shows Conlin (Dominic Fumusa) the photos that Quinn took, showing the man across the street who had access to Sekou's van the night before the bombing. Conlin talks to Saad (Leo Manzari) and confirms that the man in the photographs was in no way connected with Sekou. Conlin tracks down the Jeep in Quinn's photographs as registered to a private corporation. At the corporation headquarters, he fakes an interest in employment and learns they are hiring former federal employees and have access to vast amounts of highly sensitive data. Conlin joins a selected group to the lower levels of the building, separates himself from them and investigates empty offices. He is discovered and escorted off the premises. Meanwhile, Carrie visits Quinn (Rupert Friend), who has been brought to a psychiatric ward. Carrie asks Quinn for more information on the man in the photos but gets nowhere; Quinn is upset at her having aided the police to arrest him and accuses her of being part of the conspiracy.

Saul (Mandy Patinkin), suspicious of the events in Abu Dhabi, gets rebuffed at the CIA when he learns there is a no-surveillance order on Tovah Rivlin. Saul reaches out to Viktor, a contact of his in the SVR, requesting information on Tovah's recent whereabouts. Viktor comes back to him with photos of Tovah's clandestine meeting with Dar Adal.

Contacted by Conlin of his discoveries, Carrie goes to his house to discuss their findings. When Carrie arrives at the front door, no one answers. She goes to the back, finds the door ajar, goes upstairs and finds Conlin dead from a gunshot wound to the head. Carrie takes the weapon from Conlin's hand. Belli (C.J. Wilson) is inside the house with a gun and hears Carrie enter. Carrie sees him in a mirror coming up behind her and is able to make an escape.

President-elect Keane (Elizabeth Marvel), fed up with her situation, gets Marjorie (Deborah Hedwall) to help smuggle her out of the safe house. Pressure mounts on Keane as President Morse (Alan Dale) makes a speech calling for a harder line on terrorism and added provisions to the Patriot Act. Nonetheless, Keane implies no change in her policy when she is questioned by the press upon her return.

Late at night, Quinn is drugged, strapped to a gurney, taken out of the ward and loaded into a van. In the back of the van, Quinn is greeted by Astrid (Nina Hoss).

== Production ==
The episode was directed by Alex Graves and written by producer Charlotte Stoudt.

== Reception ==
=== Reviews ===
The episode received a rating of 100% with an average score of 7.12 out of 10 on the review aggregator Rotten Tomatoes, with the site's consensus stating "'The Return' answers lingering questions only to introduce more in a mysterious, thrilling episode of cat-and-mouse".

Aaron Riccio of Slant Magazine highlighted the directing of the episode, describing it as "a visual tour de force in which director Alex Graves frames the episode so as to reinforce what Conlin begrudgingly accepts: that the truth is sometimes discomforting". Shirley Li of Entertainment Weekly gave the episode a B+ grade, praising most aspects, but writing of President-elect Keane "her isolation and road trip with Marjorie dragged the episode down".

=== Ratings ===
The original broadcast was watched by 900,000 viewers.
