= Five and a Half Love Stories in a Vilnius Apartment =

Lithuanian, Irish and Latvian co-production romantic comedy-drama film

Five and a Half Love Stories in a Vilnius Apartment (Lithuanian: 5 ½ meilės istorijos viename Vilniaus bute) is a 2023 Lithuanian, Irish and Latvian co-production romantic comedy-drama film by Lithuanian-American director Tomas Vengris, with the plot co-written by him and Tatia Rosenthal. The title refers to love stories/crises that happened to several foreigners who in turn temporarily rent an apartment in Vilnius, not aware of each other. The only connecting character is an apartment cleaner, who erases the trace of each story.

== Synopsis ==
At the beginning of the film, the apartment is occupied by a bachelorette party from Ireland. Next, a couple from Israel moves in. Later it is rented by a DJ from Hungary. The fourth story is that of a stripper from the first story, who comes into the apartment with a guy she wants to impress (and scares an elderly couple from Poland). The apartment cleaner, who removes the traces of the previous visits, turns out has a love story of herself.

== Production ==
The film was financed by the Lithuanian Film Centre, the Council of Europe foundation Eurimages, Screen Ireland, the Latvian National Film Centre and the Lithuanian National Radio and Television.

Film critic Monika Gimbutaitė suggests that the film title was the influence of Federico Fellini's 8½.

The film employs Hungarian, Hebrew, Lithuanian, English, and Polish languages, with subtitles.

== Cast ==
Velta Žygure, Vidas Petkevičius, Jonas Braškys, Valene Kane, Alison Oliver, Ella Lily Hyland, Maria Oxley Boardman, Doireann May White, Marijus Mažūnas, Yiftach Klein, Hadar Ratzon-Rotem, Ieva Andrejevaitė, Šarūnas Datenis, Géza Röhrig, Adelė Šuminskaitė, Gintautė Rusteikaitė, Skomantas Duoplys, Juliusz Krzysztof Warunek, Magdalena Celówna, Andrius Žiurauskas.

== Awards ==
- 2023: "Rebels With a Cause" program Best Film award at the Tallinn film festival "Black Nights"
- 2024: Sidabrinė gervė 2024: the film was nominated in several categories, and Hadar Ratzon-Rotem won the "Best Supporting Actress" award.
