= Jungleland (film) =

2019 sports drama film by Max Winkler

- Theatrical release poster
- Directed by: Max Winkler
- Written by: Theodore B. Bressman; David Branson Smith; Max Winkler
- Produced by: Jules Daly; Brad Feinstein; Ryan Stowell; Kevin J. Walsh
- Starring: Charlie Hunnam; Jack O'Connell; Jessica Barden; Jonathan Majors; John Cullum
- Cinematography: Damián Garcia
- Edited by: Tomas Vengris
- Music by: Lorne Balfe
- Production companies: Scott Free Productions; Romulus Entertainment; Vertical
- Distributed by: Paramount Pictures
- Release dates: September 12, 2019 (Toronto); November 6, 2020 (United States)
- Running time: 90 minutes
- Country: United States
- Language: English

Jungleland is a 2019 American sports drama film directed by Max Winkler, from a screenplay by Winkler, Theodore B. Bressman, and David Branson Smith. Starring Charlie Hunnam, Jack O'Connell, Jessica Barden, Jonathan Majors, John Cullum, and Nick Mullen, the film follows Walter "Lion" Kaminski (O'Connell), a former professional boxer whose ex-convict brother and manager Stanley (Hunnam) is indebted to gangster Pepper (Majors). In order to pay off his brother's debt, Lion agrees to drive Sky (Barden) across the country and to participate in an underground boxing match.

Jungleland premiered at the Toronto International Film Festival on September 12, 2019, and was theatrically released in the United States on November 6, 2020, to positive reviews from critics.

== Plot ==
Walter "Lion" Kaminski, a talented former professional boxer and his brother Stanley, an ex-con and Lion's idealistic manager, work menial jobs in a sewing factory. At night, the pair participate in underground boxing matches, often squatting at a dilapidated house in the slums of Fall River, Massachusetts with their whippet Ash.

Stanley is in debt to Pepper, a local gangster, and in order to pay off, he allows the money to ride on Lion for their next fight. During the fight, Pepper shows up to watch and Lion realizes that Stanley bet on him to win; he angrily throws the fight. An enraged Pepper beats Stanley, but sees potential in Lion due to his skill. He proposes that they pay off the debt by completing a task: to drive a young girl named Sky to Reno, Nevada before having Lion compete at an underground prizefight called "Jungleland" in San Francisco's Chinatown.

Having no choice, Stanley agrees and Pepper provides him with cash, an SUV, and a pistol. Along the way, they stop at a bar where Sky befriends Lion while Stanley has sex with a woman he met in their hotel. Sky stages a distraction and drugs Lion with a Xanax to steal the car keys before escaping. She accidentally crashes the SUV and tries to run before Stanley catches up to her. Locking Sky in their hotel room, he calls Pepper and demands answers only to find out that Sky is an underage prostitute who must be delivered to Yates, a pimp who Stanley has had dealings with in the past.

Sky pleads with Stanley and Lion not to take her to Reno, but Stanley retorts by saying that Pepper will kill them if they don't. The trio take the SUV to a local garage, but they do not have enough money to pay for the repairs. While searching through Sky's wallet, Stanley finds out her real name is Mary McGinty and that her estranged, strictly religious family lives in Gary, Indiana. The trio take a taxi to meet them while posing as churchgoers in an effort to get more money from them. After insulting and demeaning her daughter for the "sinful" path she's taken, Sky's mother, Pam, angrily forces them to leave.

The trio squat that night in a school that is closed for the season. While there, Stanley cooks food for the group while Sky and Lion further bond, and Lion reveals the brothers' dream to open a dry cleaners. Sky questions his relationship with Stanley, observing that he treats Lion like a servant, not a brother, routinely putting him in harm's way, which Lion objects to. In the morning, the pair make their way back to the garage and make a deal with the mechanics to let them have the car if Lion beats two of them simultaneously in a street fight. A reluctant Lion agrees and handily beats the two. The trio drive across the country, stopping off to get lunch at a restaurant where Lion accuses Stanley of using him for his own benefit. A furious Stanley reminds Lion of all the sacrifices that he has made in order to help his brother, but he retorts by revealing his arthritis and difficulty moving his hands along with remembering events due to all the fighting he has done. Their outburst gets them kicked out of the restaurant when Ash begins to bark incessantly and Stanley gets punched by an irate customer and having the SUV towed.

With no money and no transport, Stanley sells Ash to a father and son from the restaurant without telling Lion, who attacks him. The three board a bus bound for Reno, but Lion and Sky get off at Carson City, Nevada, leaving a sleeping Stanley who wakes up in Reno. He is then kidnapped by Yates' men for not delivering Sky. At a bar, Lion implores Sky to run away with him, having fallen for her. Sky refuses and they have sex in the bathroom, where Lion realizes that Sky is pregnant with Yates' baby. Sky departs, leaving Stanley's gun and some money with him, which he uses to go to Reno. Finding Yates' hideout, who has been torturing Stanley, Lion incapacitates his henchman. As Yates gloats over prostituting Sky, Lion executes him. A freed Stanley says that the pair can run away together and not have to go to San Francisco, but Lion is determined to fight at Jungleland.

A reluctant Stanley goes with him and before the fight, he breaks down in tears, apologizing for all the hurt he has dealt on Lion. Lion forgives Stanley and shows him a ring robe made by Sky as a parting gift, which Stanley is impressed by. The pair walk out to the ring, and Lion fights well, but is distracted and knocked down. A regretful Stanley pleads with Lion not to get up, saying that they can do something else with their lives, but Lion gets up regardless and wins the fight in spectacular fashion. However, the police enter the venue looking for Stanley, who left his ID behind at the murder scene in Reno. Stanley decides to turn himself in to give Lion a chance to get the money. Whilst Lion revels in his victory and Stanley is led away, Sky shows up at the venue as the two reunite.

== Cast ==
- Jack O'Connell as Walter "Lion" Kaminski
- Charlie Hunnam as Stanley Kaminski
- Jessica Barden as Mary "Sky" McGinty
- Jonathan Majors as Pepper
- Owen Burke as Meadows
- Fran Kranz as Buck Noble
- Frank L. Ridley as Burly Father
- John Cullum as Yates
- Nick Mullen as Clay Carlson
- Lucien Spelman as Roman
- Jere Shea as Sky's stepfather
- Margaret Devine as Pam McGinty, Sky's estranged mother
- Patrick M. Walsh as Left DeNunzio
- James Perella as Domo Giomo
- Robert Otis as Cue Ball
- Bill Thorpe as Zeus
- Johnno Wilson as Reggie
- Scott Fielding as Milos
- Ed LaVache as The Referee
- Meredith Holzman as Darlene
- Michael Tow as Kind Father
- Joseph Oliveira as Joey (uncredited)
- Francis Radovanovic as Luke (uncredited)

== Production ==
Principal photography on the film began on August 27, 2018, in Taunton, Fall River and New Bedford, Massachusetts; Pawtucket, Rhode Island; Buffalo, New York; Gary, Indiana; Reno, Nevada and San Francisco, California.

== Release ==
The film had its world premiere at the Toronto International Film Festival on September 12, 2019. In September 2020, Vertical Entertainment acquired U.S. distribution rights to the film. It was released in a limited release on November 6, 2020, followed by video on demand on November 10, 2020.

== Reception ==
On Rotten Tomatoes, the film holds an approval rating of 73% based on 56 reviews, with an average rating of 6.4/10. The site's critics consensus reads: "Thanks to muscular work from director/co-writer Max Winkler and his stars, Jungleland punches above its weight in a crowded genre." On Metacritic, the film has a weighted average score of 53 out of 100, based on 15 critics, indicating "mixed or average" reviews.
