= List of Homeland characters =

Listing of characters on American television series Homeland

This is a list of characters appearing in the Showtime drama television series Homeland.

== Appearances ==
= Main cast (credited)
= Recurring cast (3+)
= Guest cast (1-2)

=== Main cast ===
Actor	Character	Seasons							
Actor	Character	1	2	3	4	5	6	7	8
Claire Danes	Carrie Mathison	Main	Main	Main	Main	Main	Main	Main	Main
Damian Lewis	Nicholas Brody	Main	Main	Main	Guest				
Morena Baccarin	Jessica Brody	Main	Main	Main					
David Harewood	David Estes	Main	Main						
Diego Klattenhoff	Mike Faber	Main	Main	Guest					
Jackson Pace	Chris Brody	Main	Main	Main					
Morgan Saylor	Dana Brody	Main	Main	Main					
Mandy Patinkin	Saul Berenson	Main	Main	Main	Main	Main	Main	Main	Main
Jamey Sheridan	William Walden	Recurring	Main						
David Marciano	Virgil Piotrowski	Recurring	Main	Recurring					
Navid Negahban	Abu Nazir	Recurring	Main	Guest					
Rupert Friend	Peter Quinn		Recurring	Main	Main	Main	Main		
Sarita Choudhury	Mira Berenson	Recurring	Guest	Main	Recurring		Guest		
Tracy Letts	Andrew Lockhart			Main	Main				
F. Murray Abraham	Dar Adal		Guest	Main	Recurring	Main	Main	Guest	
Nazanin Boniadi	Fara Sherazi			Recurring	Main				
Laila Robins	Martha Boyd				Main				
Sebastian Koch	Otto Düring					Main	Guest		
Miranda Otto	Allison Carr					Main			
Alexander Fehling	Jonas Hollander					Main			
Sarah Sokolovic	Laura Sutton					Main			
Elizabeth Marvel	Elizabeth Keane						Main	Main	
Maury Sterling	Max Piotrowski	Recurring	Recurring	Recurring	Recurring		Recurring	Main	Main
Jake Weber	Brett O'Keefe						Recurring	Main	
Linus Roache	David Wellington						Guest	Main	Main
Morgan Spector	Dante Allen							Main	
Costa Ronin	Yevgeny Gromov							Recurring	Main
Nimrat Kaur	Tasneem Qureishi				Recurring				Main
Numan Acar	Haissam Haqqani				Recurring				Main

=== Recurring cast ===
Actor	Character	Seasons							
Actor	Character	1	2	3	4	5	6	7	8
Afton Williamson	Helen Walker	Recurring							
Amy Hargreaves	Maggie Mathison	Recurring	Guest	Recurring	Recurring			Recurring	Guest
Alok Tewari	Latif Bin Walid	Recurring							
Omid Abtahi	Raqim Faisel	Recurring							
Marin Ireland	Aileen Morgan	Recurring	Guest						
Hrach Titizian	Danny Galvez	Recurring	Recurring						
James Rebhorn	Frank Mathison	Guest	Guest	Recurring					
James Urbaniak	Larry	Guest	Guest						
Marc Menchaca	Lauder Wakefield	Guest	Recurring						
Chris Chalk	Tom Walker	Recurring		Guest					
Ramsey Faragallah	Mansour Al-Zahrani	Recurring							
Billy Smith	Special Agent Hall	Guest	Guest	Guest					
Nasser Faris	Bassel	Guest	Guest						
Zuleikha Robinson	Roya Hammad		Recurring						
Valerie Cruz	Joy Mendez		Recurring						
Timothée Chalamet	Finn Walden		Recurring						
Talia Balsam	Cynthia Walden		Recurring						
Tim Guinee	Scott Ryan		Guest	Recurring					Recurring
Mido Hamada	M.M.		Recurring						
Chance Kelly	Mitchell Clawson		Guest	Guest					
Sam Underwood	Leo Carras			Recurring					
Gary Wilmes	Troy Richardson			Recurring					
Jason Butler Harner	Paul Franklin			Recurring					
Shaun Toub	Majid Javadi			Recurring			Recurring		
William Abadie	Alain Bernard			Recurring					
William Sadler	Michael Higgins			Recurring					
Suraj Sharma	Aayan Ibrahim				Recurring	Guest			
Alex Lanipekun	Hank Wonham				Recurring	Guest			
Akshay Kumar	Rahim				Recurring				
Shavani Seth	Kiran				Recurring				
Claire Keane; McKenna Keane (Note: In the fourth season, Franny is portrayed by an uncredited baby actress. In the fifth season, Franny is portrayed by baby actresses Luna and Lotta Pfitzer.)	Frances Mathison				Recurring	Guest	Recurring	Recurring	
Michael O'Keefe	John Redmond				Recurring				
Mark Moses	Dennis Boyd				Recurring				
Raza Jaffrey	Aasar Khan				Recurring				
Art Malik	Bunran Latif				Recurring				Recurring
Nina Hoss	Astrid				Guest	Recurring	Recurring		
John Getz	Joe Crocker				Guest	Guest	Guest		
Atheer Adel	Numan					Recurring			
Sven Schelker	Armand Korzenik					Recurring			
Micah Hauptman	Mills					Recurring			
Allan Corduner	Etai Luskin					Recurring	Guest		
Mark Ivanir	Ivan Krupin					Recurring		Guest	
Alireza Bayram	Qasim					Recurring			
René Ifrah	Bibi Hamed					Recurring			
Morocco Omari	Conrad Fuller					Recurring			
Hadar Ratzon-Rotem	Tova Rivlin					Guest	Guest	Guest	
Hill Harper	Rob Emmons						Recurring		
Robert Knepper	Jamie McClendon						Recurring	Guest	
Dominic Fumusa	Ray Conlin						Recurring		
Patrick Sabongui	Reda Hashem						Recurring		
Zainab Jah	Aby Bah						Recurring		
J. Mallory McCree	Sekou Bah						Recurring		
Ashlei Sharpe Chestnut	Simone Bah						Recurring		
Leo Manzari	Saad Mahsud						Recurring		
C.J. Wilson	Porteous Belli						Recurring		
Bernard White	Farhad Nafisi						Recurring		
James Mount	Agent Thoms						Recurring		
Seth Numrich	Nate Joseph						Recurring		
Marin Hinkle	Christine Lonas						Recurring	Guest	
David Thornton	George Pallis						Recurring		
Lesli Margherita	Sharon Aldright						Guest	Recurring	
Jacqueline Antaramian	Dorit						Guest		Guest
Julee Cerda	Reiko Umon						Guest	Guest	
Dylan Baker	Sam Paley							Recurring	
Ellen Adair	Janet Bayne							Recurring	
Mackenzie Astin	Bill Dunn							Recurring	
Courtney Grosbeck	Josie Mathison Dunn							Recurring	
Sandrine Holt	Simone Martin							Recurring	
Matt Servitto	Special Agent Maslin							Recurring	
Sakina Jaffrey	Dr. Meyer							Recurring	
David Maldonado	Bo Elkins							Recurring	
Colton Ryan	J.J. Elkins							Recurring	
James D'Arcy	Thomas Anson							Recurring	
William Popp	Stein							Recurring	
Clé Bennett	Doxie Marquis							Recurring	
Ari Fliakos	Carter Bennet							Recurring	
Catherine Curtin	Sandy Langmore							Recurring	
Peter Vack	Clint Prower							Recurring	
Beau Bridges	Ralph Warner							Recurring	Guest
Elya Baskin	Viktor Makarov							Recurring	Guest
Merab Ninidze	Sergei Mirov							Recurring	Guest
Damian Young	Jim							Recurring	
Mohammad Bakri	Abdul Qadir G'ulom								Recurring
Andrea Deck	Jenna Bragg								Recurring
Cliff Chamberlain	Mike Dunne								Recurring
Charles Brice	John Durkin								Recurring
Sam Chance	Drew Soto								Recurring
Octavio Rodriguez	Arturo Gonzales								Recurring
Victor Almanzar	Justin Wenzel								Recurring
Jason Tottenham	Alan Yager								Recurring
Emilio Cuesta	Charlie Stoudt								Recurring
Sam Trammell	Benjamin Hayes								Recurring
Elham Ehsas	Jalal Haqqani								Recurring
Seear Kohi	Balach								Recurring
Eugene Lee	General Mears								Recurring
Terry Serpico	General Owens								Recurring
Tracy Shayne	Janet Gaeto								Recurring
Mustafa Haidari	Firooz								Recurring
Karen Pittman	Vanessa Kroll								Recurring
Hugh Dancy	John Zabel								Recurring

== Main characters ==
The following is a list of series regulars who have appeared in one or more of the series' eight seasons. The characters are listed in the order they were first credited in the series.

=== Carrie Mathison ===
Played by Claire Danes, Carrie Mathison is a CIA officer and the series' protagonist. Carrie is an intrepid, fiercely devoted agent who often resorts to underhanded or illegal means of chasing leads. She struggles with bipolar disorder, for which she receives treatment from her sister Maggie, a psychiatrist, and has a longstanding mentor relationship with Saul Berenson. While deployed in Iraq prior to the events of the series, Carrie receives intelligence that leads her to suspect rescued American POW Nicholas Brody of being a terrorist, initiating a long and increasingly personal pursuit that defines her career and personal life.

In season 1, Carrie conducts an unauthorized investigation into Brody, becoming obsessed with him and entering a brief romantic relationship. Though her suspicions are correct, Brody exposes her investigation, costing her job. Carrie prevents Brody's suicide bombing attempt but is led to believe he was innocent, leaving her demoralized and prompting her to undergo electroconvulsive therapy for her bipolar disorder.

In season 2, a confession video implicating Brody brings Carrie back to the CIA. She interrogates and flips him into an asset against al-Qaeda, acting as his handler as their relationship resumes. After being kidnapped by Abu Nazir, Carrie helps facilitate his capture. When Brody is framed for the bombing of the CIA's Langley headquarters, she aids his escape and vows to clear his name.

In season 3, Carrie and Saul orchestrate a plan to turn Iranian official Majid Javadi, the mastermind behind the Langley bombing, by publicly discrediting Carrie and committing her to a psych ward as cover. The operation succeeds, and Brody is brought back to carry out the assassination of a key al-Qaeda figure in Tehran. Carrie convinces him to accept the mission and later reveals she is pregnant with his child. Brody is captured and executed, and Carrie witnesses his public hanging.

In season 4, Carrie becomes CIA station chief in Kabul, leaving her daughter Franny with her sister Maggie. Known as the “Drone Queen,” she later transfers to Islamabad after botching a strike on Taliban leader Haissam Haqqani, and leads efforts in searching for him, going so far as seducing Haqqani's young nephew to use him as an asset. Disillusioned after learning Saul sanctioned a covert deal with Haqqani, Carrie quits the CIA.

In season 5, Carrie lives in Berlin as a security consultant for a nonprofit, with her daughter and boyfriend Jonas. She survives an attempt on her life and learns she was targeted by the Russian government, who have infiltrated the CIA's Berlin station. Carrie later diverts her efforts to rescue Peter Quinn, who suffers a sarin attack by a jihadist cell. Though she stops the jihadist group's planned terror attack in Berlin, Carrie declines to return to the CIA.

In season 6, Carrie works at a New York nonprofit providing legal aid to American Muslims while secretly advising President-elect Elizabeth Keane. She cares for Quinn and loses custody of Franny after Dar Adal manipulates child services. Quinn uncovers a black ops plot against Keane and dies saving her and Carrie. Carrie later regains custody of Franny and briefly serves as a White House advisor before being fired amid Keane's retaliatory purges.

In season 7, Carrie investigates Keane but learns the Russians are destabilizing the U.S. government. After repeatedly endangering Franny, she relinquishes custody to Maggie. Carrie and Saul travel to Russia to extract a major witness; Carrie is captured while diverting Russian authorities and spends months imprisoned without medication. Saul eventually secures her release, leaving her severely impaired.

In season 8, Carrie recovers in Germany with little memory of her captivity before returning to Kabul to assist in Afghan peace negotiations. After a helicopter crash kills U.S. and Afghan presidents Warner and Daoud, Carrie works with Russian agent Yevgeny Gromov to recover evidence that could prevent war. She trades the identity of Saul's longtime Kremlin asset to avert the war and escapes to Russia with Yevgeny. Two years later, Carrie lives in Moscow with Yevgeny, having defected, while secretly operating as Saul's new Russian asset.

=== Nicholas Brody ===
Played by Damian Lewis, Nicholas Brody is a former U.S. Marine, the husband of Jessica Brody, and the father of Dana and Chris. Captured by al-Qaeda during a mission in Iraq, he is held as a prisoner of war for eight years, during which he is brutalized and ultimately radicalized by Abu Nazir, who recruits him as a sleeper agent to be sent back to the United States.

In season 1, Brody returns home a national hero but struggles to reintegrate into family life, which is strained by Jessica's affair with his best friend Mike. Secretly working for Nazir, he begins an affair with CIA officer Carrie Mathison, who suspects him of being a terrorist. Brody successfully reaches a secure bunker with Vice President Walden while wearing a suicide vest, but aborts the attack after an emotional phone call from Dana, leaving without raising suspicion.

In season 2, Brody capitalizes on his public image and the Vice President's support to win a seat in the U.S. House of Representatives. He continues working for Nazir until the CIA uncovers his role. Carrie persuades him to turn against al-Qaeda, and his intelligence helps prevent a major attack. He is later framed as the perpetrator of the CIA headquarters bombing on 12/12, becoming the most wanted man in America. Carrie helps him flee to Canada, promising to clear his name.

In season 3, Brody resurfaces in Caracas, injured and held by mercenaries with CIA ties, kept addicted to heroin and mentally broken. Saul negotiates his release and, after his recovery, convinces him to carry out an assassination in Tehran to kill IRGC chief Danesh Akbari, enabling Majid Javadi to take his place as a CIA asset. Before leaving, Brody has a final, rejected farewell with Dana. He successfully completes the mission, escapes to a CIA safehouse, and learns from Carrie that she is pregnant with his child. Brody is soon captured by Iranian authorities and executed by public hanging, which Carrie witnesses despite his objections.

Brody briefly reappears in season 4 as a hallucination to Carrie, whose bipolar medication was swapped for a hallucinogen by the ISI. Carrie tearfully embraces who she believes to be Brody, but is in fact ISI colonel Aasar Khan.

=== Saul Berenson ===
Played by Mandy Patinkin, Saul Berenson is a veteran CIA intelligence officer, initially serving as Middle East Division Chief. He recruits and mentors Carrie Mathison, forming a close but often strained partnership shaped by his cautious, institutional instincts and her impulsive methods. Deeply committed to his work, Saul's career comes at the cost of his personal life, including a failing marriage and long-standing family estrangements.

In season 1, Saul dismisses Carrie's suspicion that rescued POW Nicholas Brody has been turned by Abu Nazir, though he places her on Brody's debriefing and repeatedly shields her from disciplinary action. He later uncovers her illegal surveillance of Brody and confronts her personal entanglement with him, but grows more convinced by her findings. His marriage struggles in the meantime, with his wife Mira moving to India for work and asking him not to join her.

In season 2, Saul exposes CIA leadership's role in covering up a fatal drone strike and discovers Brody's confession tape, helping form a task force alongside Carrie to use Brody as a double agent. After CIA Director David Estes is killed in the Langley bombing on 12/12, Saul becomes acting director.

In season 3, Saul and Carrie execute a plan to expose Majid Javadi, the Iranian intelligence chief behind the 12/12 attacks, by publicly discrediting Carrie to draw him out. Saul leverages Javadi's past crimes to turn him into a CIA asset and sends him back to Iran. At the same time, Saul clashes with Senator Andrew Lockhart, learns his wife is having an affair, and faces his imminent removal as CIA director. Saul brings a broken, heroin-addicted Brody back from Caracas to carry out a covert mission to assassinate IRGC chief Danesh Akbari and install Javadi in his place. While the operation succeeds geopolitically, Lockhart and Dar Adal undermine Saul by leaking Brody's location, leading to Brody's execution. Despite achieving a strategic breakthrough with Iran, Saul is fired from the CIA and moves into the private sector.

In season 4, Saul, now working in the private sector and living in New York with Mira, travels to Islamabad, where he reconnects with ambassador Martha Boyd. He is later kidnapped by Taliban leader Haissam Haqqani, who uses him as leverage to negotiate a prisoner exchange. Saul later agrees to a covert deal brokered by Dar Adal that spares Haqqani in exchange for Taliban concessions, believing it necessary for long-term stability, while also positioning him to rejoin the CIA as director. Carrie is enraged upon learning about the deal.

In season 5, Saul, divorced from Mira, works as the head of the CIA's European division in Berlin, his bid for director torpedoed by Carrie after she lobbied against him. Though the CIA suffers a leak of documents attesting to its illegal surveillance of German citizens, Saul secretly continues the program after agreeing to shut it down, and begins a relationship with Berlin station chief Allison Carr, unaware she is a Russian mole. After Carrie exposes Allison's betrayal, Saul helps orchestrate her interception and death, narrowly containing the Russian operation.

In season 6, Saul advises President-elect Elizabeth Keane during her transition. He investigates Iran's nuclear compliance through Majid Javadi, but Dar Adal manipulates Javadi into misleading Keane that Iran is contravening their nuclear agreement. Saul and Carrie expose Dar's conspiracy, but after an assassination attempt on Keane, she orders mass arrests of federal employees, including Saul.

In season 7, Saul is released and becomes National Security Advisor, overseeing domestic security crises (including an armed standoff with followers of right-wing provocateur Brett O'Keefe) and uncovering a Russian disinformation campaign undermining Keane's presidency. He and Carrie travel to Moscow to extract Simone Martin, a key Russian witness; Carrie is captured diverting Russian authorities, and Saul later negotiates her release after months of imprisonment.

In season 8, Saul remains National Security Advisor under President Ralph Warner and leads negotiations to end the war in Afghanistan. After Warner's death, Saul's influence wanes under the new administration, but he works with Carrie to prevent war with Pakistan by proving the helicopter crash that killed Warner and the Pakistani president was accidental. When Carrie trades the identity of Saul's longtime Kremlin asset, Anna Pomerantseva, to avert conflict, Anna commits suicide to avoid capture. Two years later, Carrie defects to Moscow, becoming Saul's new asset inside the Kremlin.

=== Jessica Brody ===
Played by Morena Baccarin, Jessica Brody is married to Nicholas Brody and mother of Dana and Chris. In the eight years her husband is gone and presumed dead, Jessica does not remarry but does engage in a serious relationship with Brody's best friend Mike Faber, which is abruptly ended when Brody returns home. The reunited couple struggle with their marriage. Brody resents Jessica's closeness with Mike, while Jessica, in turn, learns of Brody's affair with Carrie. As Brody's behavior becomes increasingly bizarre, Jessica suspects further infidelity. While Brody is assisting the CIA, Jessica and Mike's relationship is rekindled. Nicholas and Jessica eventually come to a mutual agreement that their marriage cannot continue. Brody is later framed for the bombing of the CIA and disappears; Jessica struggles to keep her family together, with Dana attempting suicide and later changing her last name and moving out of the house.

=== David Estes ===
Played by David Harewood, David Estes is the director of the CIA's Counterterrorism Center. He has a tense relationship with Carrie, partly due to a past affair with her which led to the end of Estes' marriage. He fires Carrie upon learning of her bipolar disorder and her multiple contraventions of CIA protocols, but later on, he must reinstate her when she is proven to have been right about Brody. Saul discovers that Estes and then-CIA-director Walden ordered a drone strike launched in Abu Nazir's homeland, resulting in the destruction of a nearby school and that his efforts to undermine Carrie were actually an attempt to cover up the incident. Estes makes plans to have Brody assassinated once Abu Nazir is neutralized, and when Saul protests, he threatens Saul's job; Quinn later threatens Estes into calling off the hit on Brody. He is among those killed when a bomb planted by al-Qaeda explodes at the CIA building.

=== Mike Faber ===
Played by Diego Klattenhoff, Mike Faber is Nicholas Brody's best friend and Jessica's lover, having served with him in the Marines. While Brody is presumed to be dead as a prisoner-of-war, Mike gets involved in a long-term relationship with Jessica and becomes very attached to her and the Brody family. The relationship is abruptly ended when Brody returns. The Brody family still comes to depend on Mike when they are neglected by Nicholas. Mike and a fellow Marine, Lauder Wakefield, feel that Brody may have had something to do with the murder of Tom Walker and investigate the matter. Saul and Estes talk him down from investigating further, but he eventually confronts Jessica with his theories. Mike and Jessica rekindle their affair while staying under CIA protection. Brody eventually gives Mike his blessing to look after his family after separating from Jessica. Mike and Jessica are seemingly vindicated in their suspicions about Brody when he is publicly framed for the bombing of the CIA's Langley headquarters. In the aftermath, Mike continues to assist Jessica amid the public scrutiny her family faces. Klattenhoff appeared in a limited capacity in season 3 after joining the series The Blacklist as a regular.

=== Chris Brody ===
Played by Jackson Pace, Chris Brody is the son of Nicholas and Jessica and younger brother to Dana. Chris is too young to remember Nicholas before he went into service, and struggles to connect with his returned father at times. When his father's behavior becomes more erratic, Chris finds comfort in the familiar presence of Mike Faber.

=== Dana Brody ===
Played by Morgan Saylor, Dana Brody is the daughter of Nicholas and Jessica Brody and the older sister of Chris. Intelligent and strong-minded, she is the family member with whom Brody reconnects most easily after his return from captivity, and the only one to whom he openly admits his conversion to Islam. Dana harbors resentment toward her mother over her affair with Mike and becomes increasingly disillusioned with her family's moral compromises.

In season 1, Dana forms a close bond with her father as he struggles to reintegrate into family life. At Carrie Mathison's urging, Dana unknowingly prevents a terrorist attack by calling Brody and emotionally “talking him down” as he prepares to detonate a suicide vest at the State Department, though she remains unaware of what he was about to do.

In season 2, Dana's life unravels after her boyfriend Finn Walden kills a pedestrian in a hit-and-run accident. Overcome with guilt, she wants to report the crime, but Brody blocks her from doing so under pressure from the CIA, deeply alienating her.

In season 3, when Brody is later exposed as having been turned by al-Qaeda, Dana attempts suicide and is hospitalized in a psychiatric facility, where she begins a relationship with fellow patient Leo Carras. Dana runs away with Leo but leaves him after learning he may have been involved in his brother's death. She changes her last name to distance herself from her father, moves out, and drifts into an isolated, precarious life, working menial jobs. Dana sees Brody one final time before his mission to Iran, rejecting his attempt at reconciliation and telling him she never wants to see him again.

=== William Walden ===
Played by Jamey Sheridan, William Walden is the Vice President of the United States and a former director of the CIA. Both Brody and Abu Nazir hold him accountable for the drone strike that killed Nazir's son Issa. Walden capitalizes on Brody's political value following his return from captivity, offering him a seat in the House of Representatives in a special election. Not long after Brody is elected to Congress, Walden launches his own presidential bid and asks Brody to be his running mate. Walden is killed during a meeting with Brody when Nazir's associates tamper with his pacemaker. Brody agrees to provide the pacemaker's serial number for Nazir in exchange for releasing Carrie as his hostage. In Walden's dying moments, Brody finally disavows him in person and refuses to save him.

=== Virgil Piotrowski ===
Played by David Marciano, Virgil Piotrowski is a freelance surveillance expert and former CIA employee. He is one of Carrie's few friends. Carrie often enlists him to help her with surveillance operations, including that of Nicholas Brody's household. He frequently runs operations alongside his younger brother Max, also a freelancer with relatively less field experience but formidable technical skill. In season 2, Saul enlists Virgil to look into CIA operative Peter Quinn, and they learn that he is not an analyst as he claimed, but an assassin working for black-ops specialist Dar Adal.

Virgil does not appear in the series past season 3, with Max largely taking over his narrative function.

=== Abu Nazir ===
Played by Navid Negahban, Abu Nazir is a high-ranking operative, possibly the operational leader, of al-Qaeda. Nazir oversees the captivity of prisoners of war Nicholas Brody and Tom Walker, and over a period of years is able to groom them both to turn on the U.S. and align with al-Qaeda. Issa, Nazir's son, is killed by a CIA-sanctioned drone strike. The incident is pivotal in shifting the allegiance of Brody, and also leads Nazir to swear revenge on the CIA and its director. He sends Brody and Walker back to the U.S. with a plot to kill Vice President Walden and many other officials, but it is thwarted by the efforts of Carrie Mathison.

Brody is captured by the CIA and forced to work with them against al-Qaeda. Nazir then infiltrates the United States himself with a new plan. First, he orchestrates the assassination of Vice President Walden, holding Carrie as a hostage as leverage to force Brody's assistance. He then sacrifices himself (killed by SWAT team), along with his cell (captured by CIA forces), in order to give the appearance that the terror threat has been neutralized. However, Nazir had planted a bomb in Brody's car, and one of his associates detonates the bomb at the CIA's headquarters, killing 219 people and wiping out much of the CIA's infrastructure, and setting up the innocent Brody as the culprit.

=== Peter Quinn ===
Played by Rupert Friend, Peter Quinn is a highly skilled black ops soldier working for a clandestine CIA unit led by Dar Adal, who recruited him at age 16. Raised almost entirely within the intelligence apparatus, Quinn is an expert assassin whose life has been defined by deniable missions and moral compromise. Though deeply loyal to the agency and drawn to field work, he is increasingly weary of the violence he carries out. Quinn often serves as a stabilizing presence for Carrie, developing romantic feelings for her despite believing a normal life is unattainable. Little of his personal life is known; he has a son with a Philadelphia police officer, Julia Diaz, who knows him only by the alias “John.”

In season 2, Quinn is introduced as a CIA analyst assigned to lead the Brody task force, initially clashing with Carrie before the two come to respect each other's instincts. Saul later discovers that Quinn is in fact a black ops officer secretly hired by David Estes to assassinate Brody once Abu Nazir is neutralized. Quinn ultimately refuses to carry out the order, recognizing it as politically motivated and unwilling to devastate Carrie. Quinn spends season 3 assisting Carrie and Saul in their mission to find Iranian intelligence head Majid Javadi.

In season 4, Quinn is posted to Islamabad and plays a key role in the search for Saul and during Haissam Haqqani's assault on the U.S. embassy, where his actions save many lives. After Haqqani escapes, Quinn defies evacuation orders and attempts to track and kill him with help from Astrid, a German intelligence officer and former lover, but stands down at Carrie's insistence to avoid civilian casualties. Back in the U.S., Quinn and Carrie share a romantic moment and discuss leaving the CIA together, but a misunderstanding leads Quinn to accept a high-risk mission in Syria, where he spends the next two years running special operations.

In season 5, Quinn is assigned to Berlin during a leak investigation and is later recruited by Saul for an off-the-books campaign targeting ISIS operatives. He helps Carrie fake her death and uncovers a plot by an ISIS cell to launch a sarin gas attack on the city. Captured by the cell, Quinn is used as a test subject for the gas but survives after one recruit administers an antidote. Doctors revive him to extract intelligence at Carrie's behest, but the process leaves him with a massive stroke and severe brain damage.

In season 6, Quinn returns to the United States suffering from profound physical and cognitive impairments and PTSD, living under Carrie's care and forming a bond with her daughter Franny. He falls out with Carrie after learning from Dar Adal that she caused his stroke. Growing increasingly paranoid, he uncovers a conspiracy by Dar's group to undermine and assassinate President-elect Elizabeth Keane; unbeknownst to him and Dar, the group was planning to frame Quinn by fabricating online evidence portraying him as a disgruntled ex-soldier with a grudge against Keane. Quinn sacrifices himself to stop the plot, dying from gunshot wounds while protecting Carrie and Keane. After his death, Carrie breaks down in tears when she finds photographs of Quinn's estranged son and of herself among his belongings.

=== Mira Berenson ===
Played by Sarita Choudhury, Mira Berenson is married to Saul Berenson (later divorced). She leaves Saul to move to New Delhi, but she returns to the U.S. after the CIA bombing. She stays at Saul's side throughout his tenure as acting director of the CIA, though she briefly begins a relationship with another man, Alain Bernard, who is later revealed to be a Mossad agent spying on Saul, acting on behalf of Andrew Lockhart. After breaking it off with Alain, she recommits to her marriage to Saul, which continues after his tenure at the CIA ends and he begins work in the private sector. However, after Saul rejoins the CIA, Mira files for divorce. They meet again in New York, as Saul prepares to go into hiding; their conversation causes Saul to reconsider.

=== Andrew Lockhart ===
Played by Tracy Letts, Senator Andrew Lockhart leads the committee investigating the bombing of the CIA. At a hunting retreat led by the White House Chief of Staff, Lockhart is revealed to be the nominee for director of the CIA to replace Saul. Lockhart clashes with Saul while the latter is still director, and hires an Israeli intelligence agent, Alain Bernard, to spy on him, a scheme which Saul uncovers. Lockhart also gives the order to have Brody eliminated after he becomes a liability for the U.S. during his mission in Iran.

As CIA director, Lockhart oversees the Islamabad crisis during the hunt for Taliban leader Haissam Haqqani, and goes to the Islamabad CIA station himself after Saul is captured by the Taliban. Lockhart unsuccessfully attempts to negotiate with the ISI for Saul's release. Later, when Haqqani and his men storm the U.S. embassy, Lockhart takes refuge with the U.S. ambassador and other officials while safeguarding a package of highly classified CIA intelligence. He is forced to give up the package when Haqqani threatens to kill CIA analyst Fara Sherazi (whom he murders anyway). In the aftermath of the fiasco, Lockhart attends the wake of Carrie's late father at her home, and informs Carrie, Saul and Quinn that he expects to be removed from his post as CIA director.

=== Dar Adal ===
Played by F. Murray Abraham, Dar Adal is a senior black ops specialist who leads a secretive cabal within the CIA known informally as “the Group.” A longtime colleague of Saul Berenson, Dar is also the handler and mentor of Peter Quinn, whom he recruited at age sixteen and shaped into an elite operative. Discreet, calculating, and ruthlessly pragmatic, Dar routinely oversteps legal and ethical boundaries in pursuit of what he believes to be strategic necessity.

In season 2, Dar lends Quinn to David Estes to oversee the Brody operation. Saul confronts him after learning Quinn was tasked with assassinating Brody if the CIA's plan failed.

In season 3, following the 12/12 Langley bombing and Saul's appointment as acting CIA director, Dar works with him to dismantle the network of Majid Javadi, the Iranian intelligence chief who financed the attack. Though initially excluded, Dar supports Saul's plan to turn Javadi into a CIA asset and install him as IRGC chief. When Brody is sent to Iran to assassinate the sitting chief, Dar and Senator Lockhart block Saul's attempt to extract him, allowing Brody to be captured and executed as the more expedient outcome.

In season 4, after Taliban leader Haissam Haqqani seizes control of Islamabad, Dar brokers a covert deal to remove Haqqani from the CIA's kill list in exchange for Taliban restraint in Afghanistan. He persuades Saul to accept the arrangement by securing the suppression of video evidence of Saul's captivity, preserving Saul's prospects of becoming CIA director. Carrie later confronts Dar, only to realize Saul is complicit in the deal.

In season 5, Dar reunites with Saul in Berlin amid a classified data leak crisis. Influenced by station chief Allison Carr, who is secretly a Russian mole, tensions arise between Dar and Saul, though both work with Carrie to stop a terrorist attack. At the season's end, Dar delivers to Carrie the farewell letter Quinn wrote before deploying to Syria.

In season 6, Dar relocates to New York to advise President-elect Elizabeth Keane but secretly plots to undermine her administration, fearing her antiwar agenda will weaken the intelligence community. He seeds false intelligence about Iranian nuclear violations, targets Carrie by placing her under surveillance and triggering child services intervention with her daughter, and oversees a disinformation campaign run by provocateur Brett O’Keefe. When a rogue faction within his cabal escalates the plot to include Keane's assassination and frame Quinn, Dar warns Carrie. Quinn dies stopping the attack, and Dar is arrested for his role in the conspiracy. Despite expressing regret over losing control of the cabal, he cautions Saul against trusting Keane, who soon orders mass arrests of federal employees.

In season 7, Dar is visited in federal prison by Senator Sam Paley, who seeks insight into Saul's sudden trip to Russia. Dar correctly infers that Saul and Carrie are running a covert operation there, helping Paley uncover Saul's attempt to exfiltrate Simone Martin, a key witness tied to a Russian conspiracy against the U.S. government.

=== Fara Sherazi ===
Played by Nazanin Boniadi, Fara Sherazi is a young Iranian-American financial analyst, who joins the CIA after the Langley bombing and assists Saul in linking the attack to IRGC deputy chief Majid Javadi. She lives with her father, who was for a time unaware that she worked for the CIA. She has an uncle in Tehran, who assists Carrie when she goes there.

Fara later joins Carrie in Islamabad alongside Max Piotrowski as part of an underground task force assembled to track down Taliban leader Haissam Haqqani. Fara follows Haqqani's nephew, medical student Aayan Ibrahim, and discovers that Haqqani did not die in a drone strike that Carrie previously ordered on his compound. Carrie uses this information to seduce Aayan into unwittingly helping the CIA locate Haqqani, though this ultimately leads to Aayan's death at his uncle's hands. Fara is later taken as a hostage by Haqqani during his raid on the U.S. embassy in Islamabad; Haqqani threatens to kill her unless CIA Director Andrew Lockhart turn over a package of highly classified intel. Lockhart complies, but Haqqani nonetheless stabs Fara to death before escaping. Max, implied to have had romantic feelings for Fara, is left devastated by her death, and later chastises Carrie for being a harsh and ungrateful mentor to her.

=== Martha Boyd ===
Played by Laila Robins, Martha Boyd is the United States ambassador to the Islamic Republic of Pakistan. She and Saul were once romantically linked, and remain friends in the present day. Martha since married Dennis Boyd, an international studies professor who is later found to be the ISI's mole inside the U.S. embassy. Martha helps Carrie entrap Dennis; while in custody, he reveals to Martha that he leaked information about the embassy's secret underground entrance to the ISI, which they realize enabled Haissam Haqqani and his Taliban soldiers to storm the embassy and steal a package of top-secret CIA intelligence. In the aftermath of the massacre at the embassy, Dennis urges Martha to give him his belt so he can hang himself in his jail cell and prevent her from being indicted as an accessory to his crimes. Martha reluctantly complies, but later finds that Dennis did not kill himself and has instead been detained by the CIA.

=== Otto Düring ===
Played by Sebastian Koch, Otto Düring is the founder of the Düring Foundation, a philanthropic organization which is headquartered in Berlin. He hires Carrie Mathison to be his head of security. Otto provides Carrie his home as a temporary safe haven while she investigates the origins of an attempt on her life, and gives her a copy of classified CIA intel passed to him by Saul (which allows her to discover Allison Carr's double agent status). After Carrie stops a terrorist attack from occurring in Berlin, Otto proposes that she become his companion, expressing his admiration for her ambition, talent and world experience. However, she declines. Otto later provides seed funding for Carrie's philanthropic organization providing legal support to Muslims in New York City, and continues making romantic overtures to her over a period of months until she finally rebuffs him.

=== Allison Carr ===
Played by Miranda Otto, Allison Carr is the CIA station chief in Berlin. She is revealed to be a longtime double agent working for the Russians, having been blackmailed by SVR officer Ivan Krupin in 2005 while serving as a case officer in Baghdad. Ivan then became her handler and lover, receiving classified American intelligence in exchange for information that would help Allison rise the ranks of the CIA. Allison is shown to be cunning, materialistic and manipulative, initiating a sexual relationship with Saul following his divorce to gain trust within the upper echelons of the CIA.

In Berlin, Allison puts out a hit on Carrie after leaked CIA documents mention a connection between Carrie and Ahmed Nazari, one of Allison's high-value assets in Baghdad who was also working for the Russians. Carrie fakes her death and goes into hiding to uncover the conspiracy, and finds clues on Nazari's laptop indicating Allison's allegiance to the Russians. Carrie and Saul hatch a plan alongside German intelligence to lure Allison into being arrested alongside Ivan through her relationship with Ahmed. Allison claims to Saul that Ivan was her asset and not vice versa, and is soon released from custody to help thwart an incoming jihadist attack on Berlin. However, the Russians inform Allison that her final task is to ensure that the attack occurs. Allison tracks down one of the jihadists' accomplices, learns the time and location of the attack, then kills the man as well as her CIA escort before shooting herself in the shoulder to stage a shootout. At the hospital, she lies about the location of the attack to mislead the authorities, then escapes while unattended. Saul makes a deal with Ivan, offering him witness protection in the U.S. in exchange for intel on Allison's extraction procedure. Saul and a team intercept Allison's car and kill her.

=== Jonas Hollander ===
Played by Alexander Fehling, Jonas Hollander is a lawyer at the Düring Foundation and Carrie's boyfriend in Berlin. He begins to distance himself from Carrie after her old life begins seeping into their partnership. He helps provide medical supplies to an injured Peter Quinn, but walks out after Carrie refuses to abandon her mission. He also offers legal representation to suspected jihadist collaborator Faisal Marwan. Jonas ultimately breaks up with Carrie out of concern for his family's safety.

=== Laura Sutton ===
Played by Sarah Sokolovic, Laura Sutton is a dissident American journalist at the Düring Foundation. She publishes leaked CIA documents attesting to mass privacy violations by the American and German governments, having received the files from a pair of hackers. Laura later makes contact with one of the hackers, Numan, who promises her the remainder of the documents. When the BND detain Faisal Marwan, a suspected jihadist who was released after the documents scandal, Laura goes on air threatening to release the remainder of the documents unless Faisal is released from custody, claiming that his civil liberties have been violated. However, Faisal commits suicide to avoid being interrogated. After Numan is arrested by the BND, Astrid threatens Laura with his deportation unless she gives the documents and goes on air denouncing Faisal as a terrorist. Laura reluctantly complies.

=== Elizabeth Keane ===
Played by Elizabeth Marvel, Elizabeth Keane is the President of the United States. A former Democratic senator from New York, Keane runs on an antiwar agenda, partially influenced by her son Andrew's death in combat while deployed in Iraq. Her stances and lack of foreign policy experience draw the ire of certain members of the intelligence community, including Dar Adal, who worries that she will curtail the CIA's powers.

Prior to her taking office, Keane enlists Carrie as a foreign policy advisor, and is beleaguered by Dar Adal and his government cabal's covert attempts to undermine her agenda, including circulating false claims of Iran violating their nuclear agreement with the U.S., as well as a disinformation campaign slandering her son as a false war hero. A special ops group led by a rogue faction of Dar's cabal attempts to assassinate Keane, but Carrie and Quinn save her, the latter sacrificing his life in the process. Keane subsequently lashes out at the U.S. intelligence community after taking office, ordering dozens of arrests of largely innocent government employees including Saul Berenson. Her presidency is subsequently targeted by a Russian conspiracy to undermine her administration, which dissenting members of her cabinet and the U.S. Senate exploit to push for her impeachment. Carrie and Saul thwart the Russian plot, but Keane nevertheless resigns the presidency, accepting that she is too divisive a leader at a time when the country is already polarized and vulnerable to foreign interference. Vice President Ralph Warner assumes the presidency afterwards.

=== David Wellington ===
Played by Linus Roache, David Wellington is the White House Chief of Staff to Presidents Elizabeth Keane, Ralph Warner and Benjamin Hayes. He is Keane's close friend and former campaign manager during her Congressional days, and is hired after Keane's previous chief of staff, Rob Emmons, is killed. In the early days of Keane's administration, Wellington learns that his on-and-off girlfriend, Simone Martin, is a Russian spy attempting to implicate him for the assassination of General Jamie McClendon, thereby sabotaging the Keane administration. After Keane resigns and her vice president, Ralph Warner, takes over, Wellington remains on as chief of staff. When Warner dies in a helicopter crash and his inexperienced VP, Benjamin Hayes, inherits the presidency, Wellington finds much of his advice falling on deaf ears.

=== Max Piotrowski ===
Played by Maury Sterling, Max Piotrowski is Virgil's younger brother, who works with him on freelance security consulting operations. Max is reserved and socially awkward, but technically adept and competent at reconnaissance work. He and Virgil help Carrie throughout the Brody investigation, installing surveillance in the Brody family's home and monitoring his activities after he becomes a CIA asset. Carrie later enlists Max alongside Fara Sherazi to her task force in Islamabad to help her find Taliban leader Haissam Haqqani. During this time, Max forms a close bond and partnership with Fara, for whom he harbors romantic feelings, until Haqqani murders Fara during a Taliban raid on the U.S. embassy. Max spends the next two years in a deep depression, and claims to have developed a methamphetamine habit to cope with his grief.

Max later moves to New York to help Carrie take care of Peter Quinn, who is recovering from a stroke. When Quinn uncovers a homegrown conspiracy against the President-elect, Max goes undercover in Brett O'Keefe's shadowy private company, which he learns is a troll farm whose services are being solicited by Dar Adal. Dar himself enlists Max's help in uncovering a plot to frame Quinn for the murder of the President-elect. After Keane's inauguration, Max continues aiding Carrie in Washington D.C., installing surveillance in Chief of Staff David Wellington's apartment, and assisting in the investigation of Simone Martin. Saul forcibly recruits Max into his Russia task force, where Max helps Carrie and Saul extract Simone from Moscow. Max and the rest of the group are personally thanked by President Keane for their efforts in thwarting the Russian conspiracy against the White House.

About a year later, Max joins a military unit in Afghanistan, still seeking justice against Haqqani and the Taliban for Fara's death. When President Warner is killed in a helicopter crash, Max and the team are dispatched to the scene. Carrie has Max retrieve the flight recorder from the helicopter to ascertain the cause of the crash; Max succeeds, but the rest of his unit is killed by the Taliban, while he is captured by a lone Taliban soldier who sells off the flight recorder. Carrie and Yevgeny Gromov track down Max, who gives Carrie the flight recorder's location before being escorted to another safehouse. At the second compound, Max is held prisoner by Haqqani's son Jalal, who threatens to execute Max unless Haqqani's death sentence is revoked. When Haqqani is executed, Jalal kills Max. While waiting for Max's body to be collected, Carrie breaks down in tears while expressing her guilt over taking Max for granted.

=== Brett O'Keefe ===
Played by Jake Weber, Brett O'Keefe is an influential right-wing radio personality. He also presides over an underground corporation that deploys vast amounts of fake social media accounts in order to influence the general population with his agenda; one of his main orders of business is to discredit president-elect Elizabeth Keane before she takes office. His corporation is enlisted by Dar Adal's government cabal in a conspiracy against Keane. Keane goes on O'Keefe's show to debate him after he falsely slanders her son, a soldier who died in combat. Dar also learns that the cabal enlisted O'Keefe without his knowledge to frame Peter Quinn for their planned assassination of Keane, and warns Carrie in time to thwart the attack.

In season 7, after Keane's inauguration, O'Keefe is labeled a fugitive and goes on the run, eventually taking shelter in Lucasville, Ohio with the Elkins family, most of whom staunchly support him. When Saul arrives with the FBI, a standoff ensues between the Elkins family (alongside their armed reinforcements) and the authorities. Saul attempts to negotiate with O'Keefe to deescalate the situation, but O'Keefe allows tensions to rise so that he can broadcast the event live. The standoff eventually culminates in a shootout that results in mass casualties, largely on the Elkins' side. O'Keefe is detained by the FBI and kept in federal custody.

=== Dante Allen ===
Played by Morgan Spector, Dante Allen is an FBI agent who previously served at the CIA's Kabul station during Carrie's tenure as station chief. In the early days of President Elizabeth Keane's administration, Dante is assigned to investigate the mass arrest of federal employees following an assassination attempt on Keane. Believing the detainees to be innocent, Carrie enlists Dante's help, and the two investigate Chief of Staff David Wellington for links to the killing of General Jamie McClendon, who orchestrated the plot. Although Carrie later uncovers evidence exonerating Wellington, Saul warns her that Dante may be manipulating the investigation on Russia's behalf.

Carrie investigates Dante and learns he resented her promotion after a botched drone strike in Kabul, a vulnerability the Russians exploited to recruit him. Despite mutual suspicion, Dante offers Carrie shelter, and the two briefly become intimate before he is arrested by Saul's team. Under interrogation, Dante refuses to cooperate until a staged poisoning convinces him the Russians are turning on him; he then implicates Wellington's girlfriend Simone Martin as a Russian asset and provides intelligence to dismantle a covert Russian bot network. While recovering in the hospital, Dante is confronted by his handler, Yevgeny Gromov, who smothers him to death after he warns Carrie over the phone of Yevgeny's presence. Carrie arrives moments too late to save him.

=== Yevgeny Gromov ===
Played by Costa Ronin, Yevgeny Gromov is a lieutenant colonel in the GRU and a specialist in large-scale disinformation campaigns targeting Western governments. He oversees a covert effort to undermine President Elizabeth Keane, running a network of online sock puppets and handling multiple moles close to the U.S. government, including FBI agent Dante Allen and Simone Martin, his lover. Yevgeny later extracts Simone from the U.S. prior to her Senate testimony, and personally murders Dante in a hospital to prevent his defection. Saul and Carrie later mount an operation to extract Simone from Russia so she can testify before Congress; Carrie impersonates Simone to draw Yevgeny away, allowing Saul's team to succeed. Yevgeny captures Carrie shortly afterward and imprisons her in a Russian gulag, withholding her medication unless she records a false denunciation of the CIA. Carrie refuses and spends seven months in captivity, during which Yevgeny claims to have saved her from suicide.

In season 8, Yevgeny resurfaces in Kabul, where he engineers repeated encounters with Carrie and reveals that they formed a “close” bond during her imprisonment, leading her to confide personal details she no longer remembers. As CIA leadership grows suspicious that Carrie has been turned, she goes rogue and works with Yevgeny to locate Max Piotrowski and the flight recorder from presidents Warner and Daoud's crashed helicopter, which proves the crash was accidental. After briefly rekindling intimacy with Carrie, Yevgeny sedates her and seizes the recorder, offering to trade it for the identity of Saul's deeply embedded Kremlin asset. Carrie ultimately exposes the asset, Anna Pomerantseva, who commits suicide to avoid capture, preventing a war between the U.S. and Pakistan but severing Carrie's relationship with Saul. Two years later, Carrie has defected to Moscow and lives with Yevgeny, who believes her loyal to Russia, unaware that she is secretly operating as Saul's new asset inside the Kremlin.

=== Tasneem Qureishi ===
Portrayed by Nimrat Kaur, Tasneem Qureishi is a senior officer in Pakistan's Inter-Services Intelligence (ISI), later rising to Director-General. Initially an antagonist, she covertly supports Taliban leader Haissam Haqqani to weaken U.S. influence in the region, operating with calculated pragmatism and a willingness to manipulate both allies and enemies to advance Pakistani interests.

In season 4, Tasneem engineers a campaign against the CIA in Islamabad, coercing Dennis Boyd into spying for the ISI, orchestrating Saul Berenson's abduction, sabotaging Carrie by drugging her medication, and deliberately delaying Pakistani military assistance during Haqqani's assault on the U.S. embassy. Her actions enable the Taliban takeover of the region and publicly rupture U.S.–Pakistani relations.

In season 8, now ISI chief, Tasneem becomes a reluctant partner to Saul amid escalating tensions between Pakistan and the United States. Though she initially works to block peace talks and backs Haqqani's son Jalal, she ultimately cooperates to prevent full-scale war, covertly providing intelligence that allows the U.S. to eliminate Jalal while publicly condemning American violations of Pakistani sovereignty.

=== Haissam Haqqani ===
Played by Numan Acar, Haissam Haqqani is a senior Taliban commander who later becomes the organization's leader. Initially a high-value CIA target, he survives a drone strike ordered by Carrie Mathison and goes into hiding, relying on his nephew Aayan Ibrahim for medical supplies. Carrie lures Aayan to Haqqani's mountain compound, but Haqqani emerges with Saul Berenson as a captive, aware that the CIA has drones poised to kill him. He executes Aayan for leading him into a trap and uses Saul as a human shield to move freely through Pakistan, reunite with his family, and reassert his power. Haqqani later leverages Saul to secure the release of Taliban prisoners and leads a brutal assault on the U.S. embassy, killing multiple CIA personnel and seizing classified intelligence, which elevates his standing within the Taliban. He subsequently strikes a covert deal with Dar Adal to be removed from the CIA's kill list in exchange for limiting terrorist activity in Afghanistan.

Years later, in season 8, Haqqani grows tired of perpetual war and opens himself to peace negotiations. Saul arranges talks, but an ISI ambush exposes that Haqqani's eldest son, Jalal, betrayed him for supporting peace talks. Haqqani exiles Jalal rather than killing him. After a helicopter crash kills U.S. President Warner and Afghan President Daoud, Haqqani is publicly blamed and ordered arrested by Afghanistan's new leadership. Seeking legitimacy, he surrenders to U.S. custody, but is quickly sentenced to death and executed by firing squad.

== Recurring characters ==
The following is a list of recurring characters who have appeared in at least three episodes of a season or in at least two episodes of two different seasons. The characters are listed in the order they were first credited in the series.

=== Helen Walker ===
Played by Afton Williamson, Helen Walker is married to Tom Walker. After learning of Tom's terrorist affiliations, Helen initially agrees to cooperate with the CIA to apprehend her husband. However, at a critical moment, she tips off Tom, allowing him to narrowly escape.

=== Maggie Mathison ===
Played by Amy Hargreaves, Margaret "Maggie" Mathison is Carrie Mathison's sister. Maggie is usually the person that Carrie goes to for support when having personal problems. As a medical doctor (though not a psychiatrist), Maggie secretly obtains medication for Carrie to control her bipolar disorder. Maggie also strives to remain in touch with her family, letting her and Carrie's father Frank stay in her home, and herself having a husband and two kids.

In season 4, once Carrie gives birth to her daughter, Franny, Maggie is largely responsible for taking care of the child, given Carrie's enduring commitment to her intelligence work. Maggie calls Carrie while she is in Islamabad to tell her that their father Frank has died of a stroke, and organizes a memorial for him that Carrie and several colleagues attend.

In season 7, Carrie and Franny move in with Maggie after Carrie is fired from her job at the White House. However, Carrie's increasing inability to look after her child, as well as the repeated trauma to which she exposes Franny because of her field work, leaves Maggie no choice but to seek custody of Franny. At the custody hearing, Carrie accepts an agreement allowing her to see Franny every other weekend.

=== Latif Bin Walid ===
Played by Alok Tewari, Latif Bin Walid is the majordomo for Prince Farid who is an agent of Abu Nazir.

=== Raqim Faisel ===
Played by Omid Abtahi, Raqim Faisel, along with his girlfriend Aileen Morgan, is a low-level al-Qaeda operative living in the United States. He is a professor at Bryden University in Washington D.C. As part of an al-Qaeda plot, Morgan and Faisel are assigned to purchase a house within sniper range of a Marine One landing pad. The CIA discovers the house, sending them on the run. Faisel is murdered by unknown assailants while he and Aileen are hiding out at a motel.

=== Aileen Morgan ===
Played by Marin Ireland, Aileen Morgan, along with her boyfriend Raqim Faisel, is a low-level al-Qaeda operative living in the United States. Morgan was born in the U.S. but took on an anti-American perspective while living her teenage years in Saudi Arabia, where she met Faisel. As part of an al-Qaeda plot, Morgan and Faisel are assigned to purchase a house within sniper range of a Marine One landing pad. The CIA discovers the house, sending them on the run. Faisel is killed, and Morgan is arrested in Mexico by Saul Berenson. In exchange for Faisel receiving a Muslim burial, she identifies the al-Qaeda accomplice who had been sent to her house as ex-Marine Tom Walker. Morgan later commits suicide after a lengthy stay in solitary confinement.

=== Danny Galvez ===
Played by Hrach Titizian, Danny Galvez is a Muslim-American CIA officer with a Lebanese mother and a Guatemalan father who assists Carrie in most of her cases. He is attacked in one of his missions and shot, and takes a few weeks to recover. He is then believed to be a mole by Carrie, but her suspicions are proven wrong when he presents his alibi for leaving the compound. He is among those killed when a bomb planted by al-Qaeda explodes at the CIA building.

=== Frank Mathison ===
Played by James Rebhorn, Frank Mathison is Carrie Mathison's father. Like Carrie, Frank also has bipolar disorder, but is able to manage it more effectively than his daughter due to his commitment to therapy and medication. Frank eventually dies in his sleep from a stroke while Carrie is working overseas; Carrie returns home to arrange his funeral. Frank's death was written to reflect the real-life passing of Rebhorn in 2014.

=== Lauder Wakefield ===
Played by Marc Menchaca, Lauder Wakefield is a disabled, alcoholic ex-Marine who served in the same platoon as Nicholas Brody, Tom Walker, and Mike Faber. When Brody returns, Lauder is antagonistic towards him. Mike beats him up for telling the truth about what was going on between him and Brody's wife, Jessica. He later comes to suspect that Brody was involved in the death of Tom Walker and enlists Mike's help in investigation, but Mike's efforts are shut down by the CIA.

=== Tom Walker ===
Played by Chris Chalk, Tom Walker is a Marine who was in active duty along with Nicholas Brody when they were both captured by al-Qaeda forces. Brody was led to believe he beat Walker to death, but Walker was secretly turned into an al-Qaeda agent as well. Both men are dispatched to the United States with roles in an impending terrorist attack. Walker's cover is blown when he is identified by Aileen Morgan, triggering a national manhunt. Walker successfully carries out his part in the attack, assassinating Elizabeth Gaines and causing a mass evacuation into the State Department, where Brody is to detonate a suicide vest to kill Vice President Walden and his national security team. Brody relents, and Walker confronts him with Nazir listening; Brody argues he can advance al-Qaeda's interests through his role as U.S. Congressman and close proximity to Walden; Nazir accepts his proposition and commands Brody to kill Walker, due to Walker's exposed identity. Brody complies. Walker's death is subsequently covered up as a CIA operation.

=== Roya Hammad ===
Played by Zuleikha Robinson, Roya Hammad is a television news reporter who secretly works for al-Qaeda, acting as an intermediary between Abu Nazir and Brody. She is eventually arrested, along with her cell, when Brody gives the CIA information regarding their planned attack on a soldiers' homecoming event. During her interrogation by Carrie, Roya boasts that al-Qaeda "does not run", making Carrie realize that Nazir is still hiding in the power plant where he kept Carrie captive.

=== Joy Mendez ===
Played by Valerie Cruz, Major Joy Mendez is a military intelligence officer who accompanies Carrie on her mission to Beirut to obtain key intelligence from the wife of a Hezbollah commander. She later serves as the head of the security detail protecting the Brody family in a safehouse after Abu Nazir threatens them.

=== Finn Walden ===
Played by Timothée Chalamet, Finn Walden is the wealthy, spoiled son of Vice President Walden. He meets Dana in private school and goes on to date her. He perpetrates a fatal hit and run on a date with Dana when he is driving recklessly, and then insists that Dana keep it a secret. He is listed among those killed when a bomb goes off outside his father's memorial service.

=== Cynthia Walden ===
Played by Talia Balsam, Cynthia Walden is married to Vice President William Walden. When Brody is elected as a U.S. Representative, Cynthia befriends and takes Jessica Brody under her wing. When her son Finn causes a car accident that results in the death of a pedestrian, Cynthia orchestrates a cover-up. Cynthia, along with her son Finn, is killed in the bombing that took place at the CIA Headquarters during her husband's memorial.

=== M.M. ===
Played by Mido Hamada, M.M. is the alias given to Abu Nazir's munitions expert, who is first seen meeting with Roya Hammad. M.M. later leads an assault on the Gettysburg tailor shop where Brody's suicide vest was manufactured, killing several CIA agents and injuring several others, in order to retrieve a large case hidden behind the walls. Saul visits Aileen Morgan hoping she can identify M.M., but she names a former classmate to deceive Saul into negotiating her transfer out of solitary confinement. M.M. and Roya later transport Brody to a meeting with Nazir, who arrives undercover in the U.S. M.M. is ultimately arrested alongside the rest of his cell by the CIA while transporting equipment to bomb a veterans' homecoming ceremony.

=== Scott Ryan ===
Played by Tim Guinee, Scott Ryan is the chief of special operations at the CIA. He oversees the operation to eliminate Majid Javadi's terrorist network in Iran, as well as the operation (led by Brody) to assassinate IRGC Chief Danesh Akbari. Years later, he assists Saul in negotiating peace talks between the U.S. and Afghanistan, and unsuccessfully attempts to save Anna Pomerantseva, Saul's highly valuable Russian asset, from capture by the GRU.

=== Leo Carras ===
Played by Sam Underwood, Leo Carras is Dana's boyfriend who she meets while in therapy. After Dana is released, she continues sneaking into the hospital to see Leo, and the two of them soon run away together. Jessica and Mike investigate and learn that Leo was only placed in psychiatric care to cover up his possible involvement in his brother's death, which he claimed was a suicide to Dana. Dana confronts Leo after seeing news reports on their disappearance name Leo as a suspect in his brother's death. Leo confesses that his brother died while the two of them were playing Russian Roulette with their father's gun at Leo's suggestion. Dana abandons Leo and turns herself in.

=== Paul Franklin ===
Played by Jason Butler Harner, Paul Franklin is an associate of Leland Bennett, whose law firm represents clients funding terrorist activities (including IGRC deputy chief Majid Javadi). Franklin arranges to have Carrie released from psychiatric detention and introduces her to Bennett. When he and Bennett are led to believe that the CIA has discovered the Langley bomber, Franklin arrives at the motel where he had been hiding out, and kills him.

=== Majid Javadi ===
Played by Shaun Toub, Majid Javadi is the Deputy Intelligence Chief of Iran, who financed the bombing of the CIA headquarters (for which Nicholas Brody was publicly framed). Javadi had worked with Saul in the past but betrayed him when he killed several American hostages who Saul was attempting to extradite from Iran during the Iranian Revolution in 1979. In retaliation, Saul helped Javadi's wife and son escape to the United States. After the bombing, Javadi attempts to turn Carrie against the CIA, but the plan fails and he is blackmailed into becoming a CIA asset after Saul and Fara Sherazi find that he had embezzled millions from his own nation to fund the attack. On his way to meet with Saul, Javadi takes a detour to the new residence of his ex-wife and daughter-in-law, and brutally murders them both before surrendering himself to Carrie and Quinn (who are too late to arrive). Saul has Javadi return to Iran as the CIA's asset; Javadi complies, given that his only alternative is to return to his country as an enemy of the state. Saul engineers a special operation to have Brody assassinate Danesh Akbari, Javadi's superior, allowing Javadi to become the IRGC's Intelligence Chief and help advance American interests in the Middle East.

In season 6, Saul covertly meets with Javadi in the West Bank amid rumors in Washington that Iran is running a parallel nuclear program with North Korea, thereby violating the terms of their agreement with the IAEA. Javadi denies it, and later comes to the U.S. himself, seeking political asylum after his dealings with the Americans are leaked to the Iranian government. Saul promises Javadi protection if he confirms with President-elect Keane that Iran is not contravening the nuclear treaty. Javadi agrees, but reverses course at the meeting with Keane, stating that Iran is indeed running an underground nuclear program. He explains to Saul that he made a deal with Dar Adal for his own protection, but Dar ultimately betrays Javadi to Mossad, who capture him. Carrie later finds Javadi's phone at the scene of his extraction, which contains footage from an interrogation of an Iranian Mossad asset who confirms that Iran is not violating the treaty.

=== Alain Bernard ===
Played by William Abadie, Alain Bernard is an apparent friend of Mira Berenson, revealed to be having an affair with her. He was later found to be an Israeli intelligence agent working for Lockhart, using Mira to get close to Saul, who he was spying on. Saul visits Alain in federal custody and has him send his contacts in Mossad to aid a CIA operation in Tehran.

=== Michael Higgins ===
Played by William Sadler, Michael "Mike" Higgins is the White House Chief of Staff. At a hunting retreat, Higgins announces that Senator Lockhart will become the new director of the CIA. Later, when Brody's unit during his Iranian infiltration mission is ambushed by Kurdish forces, Higgins proposes using hellfire missiles to wipe out the platoon, but Saul and Carrie overrule him.

=== Aayan Ibrahim ===
Played by Suraj Sharma, Aayan Ibrahim is a medical student studying in Islamabad. He is one of the survivors of a CIA drone strike intended for his uncle, Taliban leader Haissam Haqqani, which instead struck a wedding that killed several civilians including Aayan's mother and sister. Aayan discovers a video he recorded on his phone of the wedding at the moment of his explosion, which his friend Rahim leaks to the Pakistani press. Aayan is later threatened by the ISI to no longer talk to the media, but Carrie, posing as a journalist, offers Aayan safe passage to London to continue his studies in exchange for his participation in her "news story". Aayan is unaware that it is a ruse intended to get him to disclose the whereabouts of his uncle Haqqani, to whom he is covertly delivering medical supplies. Carrie seduces Aayan as part of her recruitment process, causing him to fall in love with her. Carrie ultimately leads Aayan to a drone-monitored rendezvous with Haqqani, who executes him for leading him into the CIA's trap. An enraged Carrie nearly orders a strike on Haqqani despite him holding Saul Berenson hostage as a human shield, but is talked down.

In season 5, Carrie hallucinates Aayan while off her medication and surveying her past field reports to deduce who ordered a hit on her, becoming tormented by guilt over the numerous civilian deaths she has been responsible for.

=== John Redmond ===
Played by Michael O'Keefe, John Redmond is a CIA agent stationed in Islamabad, who was named acting station chief after the death of his predecessor, Sandy Bachman. However, Carrie maneuvers to get herself placed as the Islamabad station chief. Redmond is initially resentful of the decision and copes using alcohol, but eventually becomes Carrie's trusted ally in her hunt for Taliban leader Haissam Haqqani. Redmond is ultimately killed during an RPG attack on a CIA convoy returning from a prisoner exchange between the American and Pakistani governments.

=== Rahim ===
Played by Akshay Kumar, Rahim is Aayan Ibrahim's friend and roommate in medical school. He leaks a video Aayan recorded of the wedding that was bombed in a drone strike ordered by the CIA, leading to protests in Islamabad. He later attends a protest against Taliban leader Haissam Haqqani after drone footage of Haqqani executing Aayan is published online.

=== Kiran ===
Played by Shavani Seth, Kiran is Aayan's girlfriend, whose parents disapprove of their relationship. Aayan enlists Kiran to hide a bag of stolen medical supplies for his ailing uncle, Taliban leader Haissam Haqqani; Kiran's father discovers the drugs and reports Aayan to his school, getting him expelled. Peter Quinn later approaches Kiran and gives her leaked drone footage of Haqqani executing Aayan, which he asks her to post online to incite protests that would draw Haqqani out and give Quinn the chance to assassinate him. Kiran attends the protest until Quinn asks her to leave to steer clear of the pipe bomb he planted, which he ultimately does not detonate.

=== Dennis Boyd ===
Played by Mark Moses, Dennis Boyd is an international studies professor at a university in Islamabad. He is married to U.S. Ambassador Martha Boyd, and was secretly sharing classified intelligence with the CIA's Islamabad station chief, Sandy Bachman, which allowed the CIA to eliminate various high-value Taliban outposts. After Sandy's death, Dennis is blackmailed by ISI agent Tasneem Qureishi into becoming the ISI's mole inside the U.S. embassy. He breaks into Carrie's apartment and replaces her bipolar medication with a powerful hallucinogen that causes her to suffer a psychotic episode, and tells Tasneem about the secret entrance to the U.S. embassy, which Taliban leader Haissam Haqqani uses to storm the embassy and kill 36 Americans. Dennis begs Martha to allow him to commit suicide in his prison cell using his belt, arguing it would save her career, but later relents and is last seen being taken away by a CIA transport.

=== Aasar Khan ===
Played by Raza Jaffrey, Aasar Khan is a colonel in the ISI, loyal to his country but largely kept out of the loop in the Pakistani government's dealings with the Taliban. He provides shelter for Carrie as she recovers from a severe psychotic episode induced by the ISI having her bipolar medication swapped for a powerful hallucinogen. Khan later learns from ISI agent Tasneem Qureishi that the poisoning was engineered to get Carrie transferred out of Islamabad, but that his intervention foiled their plans. Khan continues to help Carrie afterwards, providing her the name of Dennis Boyd as the ISI's mole inside the U.S. embassy. During the Taliban's attack on the embassy, Carrie calls Khan to send in backup, but Tasneem stops him, revealing to him her allegiance with the Taliban. Khan later stops Carrie from assassinating Haqqani, alerting her to Dar Adal's presence in Haqqani's entourage.

=== Bunran Latif ===
Played by Art Malik, Bunran "Bunny" Latif is a general in the Pakistani army and the former head of the ISI. He is an old friend and colleague of Saul's who has since developed a deep animosity for the United States due to their foreign policy decisions after 9/11, which he believes to have been a hoax. Under his leadership, the ISI helps the Taliban undermine U.S. presence in Islamabad, which culminates in an attack on the American embassy that results in the U.S. pulling out of the region. Years later, in season 8, Latif passes on leadership of the ISI to his stepdaughter, Tasneem Qureishi, who proved instrumental in helping the Taliban initially succeed.

=== Astrid ===
Played by Nina Hoss, Astrid is a German intelligence officer working for the BND. She shares years of on-again, off-again sexual history with Peter Quinn, for whom she has unrequited romantic feelings. For a time, Astrid is stationed in Islamabad, where she helps Quinn track down Haissam Haqqani; she meets Carrie along the way, repeatedly referring to her as Quinn's "girlfriend". Two years later, Astrid is embroiled in the controversy that results from the CIA and BND's covert surveillance program being leaked. She helps Carrie and Saul uncover the Russian government's infiltration of the CIA's Berlin station. When Quinn is captured by a jihadist cell and used as a test subject for a planned sarin gas attack, Astrid helps Carrie track down the location of the compound where Quinn was being held, ultimately rescuing him. Astrid also forces dissident American journalist Laura Sutton to publicly denounce a terror suspect detained by the BND in exchange for allowing Numan, a hacker who stole classified CIA documents, to remain in Germany.

In season 6, Astrid breaks Quinn out of a New York psychiatric facility, bringing him to a remote cabin on Dar Adal's behalf and looking after him. However, a traumatized Quinn distrusts Astrid and repeatedly lashes out at her, and later empties the bullets out of Astrid's gun while she is away. That night, a rogue assassin from Dar Adal's black ops group ambushes the cabin and kills a defenseless Astrid. Quinn, feeling immense guilt over Astrid's death, eventually tracks down the assassin and brutally murders him as revenge.

=== Numan ===
Played by Atheer Adel, Numan is a hacker operating out of Berlin, where he immigrated from Turkey after being declared an enemy of the state. Numan and his partner Armand Korzenik uncover a trove of CIA documents revealing at the CIA and the BND violated the privacy of German citizens as part of a counterterrorism effort. Numan leaks one of the documents to journalist Laura Sutton, who publishes them, causing a national scandal. He later contacts Laura personally to give her the rest, but learns that Korzenik sold them to Russian intelligence officers. Numan later finds that the Russians murdered Korzenik and his girlfriend. Laura introduces Numan to Carrie, who he helps investigate the Russian government's infiltration of the CIA's Berlin station. He is eventually arrested by the BND, but Astrid makes a deal with Laura to publicly denounce a terror suspect detained by the BND, threatening to deport Numan to Turkey otherwise. Laura is forced to cut contact with Numan afterwards.

=== Armand Korzenik ===
Played by Sven Schelker, Armand Korzenik is a hacker operating in Berlin alongside his partner, Numan. The two uncover CIA documents revealing mass violations of the privacy of German citizens by the American and German governments. Korzenik attempts to sell copies of the documents to Russian intelligence, but they torture him for the location of the other copies before killing him and his girlfriend.

=== Etai Luskin ===
Played by Allan Corduner, Etai Luskin is an Israeli ambassador and Saul's longtime friend. Etai has Saul extracted from CIA custody under the guise of defection after the CIA unduly suspect Saul of working against them. Etai brings Carrie to the safehouse he prepares for Saul, allowing the two of them to uncover the Russians' infiltration of the CIA's Berlin station. Months later, Etai detains Saul on his way back from the West Bank, inquiring about a covert meeting Saul held (which, unbeknownst to Etai, was with Majid Javadi). However, Etai is forced to release Saul after reports emerge about a bombing in New York City.

=== Ivan Krupin ===
Played by Mark Ivanir, Ivan Krupin is a high-ranking Russian intelligence officer in the SVR. Years ago, Ivan blackmailed CIA officer Allison Carr into becoming a mole for Russia and spent the subsequent decade grooming her as an asset, receiving vital state secrets in exchange for information that would advance Allison up the ranks of the CIA. Ivan works as Allison's handler during her tenure as station chief in Berlin, and orders a hit on Carrie due to her association with one of Allison's former assets (who was also working with Russia). Ivan is eventually apprehended by the CIA during a sting operation to expose Allison's betrayal. He agrees to give Saul details on the SVR's plan to extract Allison from Germany in exchange for witness protection in the United States.

Saul later visits Ivan in Wyoming, where is staying under witness protection, to inquire about possible Russian interference with the administration of President Elizabeth Keane. Saul names Yevgeny Gromov, a GRU operative known for his disinformation efforts; Ivan feigns ignorance, but later comes out of witness protection to confront Yevgeny himself, who considers Ivan the product of a bygone era of Russian espionage. Yevgeny and his men later intercept Ivan during a planned rendezvous with Saul and drown him, leaving evidence of his death for Saul to find.

=== Qasim ===
Played by Alireza Bayram, Qasim is a young, inexperienced recruit to an ISIS cell operating out of Berlin, led by Qasim's cousin Bibi Hamed. Qasim becomes doubtful about the jihadists' mission after learning that it involves a chemical attack on Berlin. While being held captive, Quinn persuades Qasim to help stop the attack. When the jihadists use Quinn as a test subject for their sarin gas chamber, Qasim discreetly injects him with an antidote to save his life. On the day of the attack, which is to occur at the Berlin train station, Carrie finds Qasim and convinces him to stop Bibi from launching the weapon. Qasim confronts Bibi, who kills him before being shot dead by Carrie, thus thwarting the attack.

=== Bibi Hamed ===
Played by René Ifrah, Bibi Hamed is the leader of a jihadist cell operating out of Berlin. After learning that Bibi's uncle is an influential emir in Syria's terrorist network, Quinn decides to accompany the jihadists to Syria, posing as a mercenary. However, Bibi reveals that his plan never was to go to Syria, but rather launch a chemical attack on Berlin itself. The jihadists hold Quinn prisoner and use him as a test subject for their sarin chamber. Bibi's cousin Qasim saves Quinn's life by injecting him with an antidote; Bibi frames and kills another member of the team as punishment, knowing Qasim was responsible but refusing to kill a family member. At the train station where the attack is to take place, Carrie convinces Qasim to stop Bibi from releasing the weapon. When Qasim confronts his cousin, Bibi kills him, only to be shot dead himself by Carrie, thus stopping the attack.

=== Franny Mathison ===
Played by an uncredited baby actress in season 4, twins Luna and Lotta Pfitzer in season 5, and Claire and McKenna Keane in seasons 6 and 7, Frances "Franny" Mathison is the daughter of Carrie Mathison and Nicholas Brody, born after her father's death. Carrie initially avoids taking care of her daughter, leaving the infant Franny to stay with Maggie while away in Kabul, and nearly drowning the child in a bathtub while spending a day watching over her. Carrie eventually embraces motherhood after returning from Islamabad, and takes Franny with her to stay in Berlin. After discovering that someone ordered a hit on her, Carrie has Franny sent back to the U.S. for her own safety.

Months later, Carrie and Franny live in New York. Carrie allows Quinn, who is recovering from a stroke, to stay in the lower floor of her apartment. During this time, Quinn bonds with Franny and protects her when a crowd of protestors and press swarm the apartment. However, this leads to a tense standoff with the authorities, leading child services to take Franny away, deeming Carrie a risk to her daughter. Carrie negotiates to reclaim custody of Franny and moves with her to Maggie's house after leaving her job at the White House. After an argument with Maggie, Carrie takes Franny with her, and the two struggle to find a place to stay until Dante Allen offers them his apartment as temporary living quarters. Carrie accepts despite suspecting Dante to be a Russian agent; the two have sex while Franny is asleep, but Saul's men burst in and apprehend Dante, traumatizing Franny. While picking up Franny from school, Carrie abruptly leaves to save Dante from being eliminated by the Russians, and nearly hits Franny with her car on the way out. Maggie, considering Carrie's treatment of her daughter to be negligent and abusive, files for custody of Franny. Carrie gives up the custody battle, accepting a visitation agreement that allows her to see Franny every other weekend.

=== Rob Emmons ===
Played by Hill Harper, Rob Emmons is President-elect Elizabeth Keane's trusted chief of staff. He is eventually killed in a car explosion intended for Keane.

=== Jamie McClendon ===
Played by Robert Knepper, General Jamie McClendon is a corrupt military officer who leads a faction of Dar Adal's black ops group in a conspiracy to assassinate President-elect Keane, planning to frame Quinn as the culprit. After the plot is thwarted, McClendon is sentenced to life in prison. However, he dies from poisoning as soon as he enters custody, and is later found to have been assassinated by the Russians in an attempt to sabotage the Keane administration.

=== Ray Conlin ===
Played by Dominic Fumusa, Ray Conlin is an FBI agent who initially clashes with Carrie over his investigation into Sekou Bah. Carrie uses a recording of Conlin pressuring his informant Saad Mahsud to entrap Sekou in order to negotiate Sekou's release. After Sekou dies in a car bombing for which he is framed, Conlin begins helping Carrie investigate a possible conspiracy behind the attack. He trails a vehicle belonging to a suspicious man living across from Carrie's apartment to a mysterious private corporation hiring former federal employees. Soon afterwards, he is assassinated in his home by the man he was investigating, who was in fact one of Dar Adal's operatives.

=== Reda Hashem ===
Played by Patrick Sabongui, Reda Hashem is a lawyer and the head of Fair Trial, a New York City nonprofit defending the civil liberties of Muslims. He and Carrie work together to clear the name of Sekou Bah, a teenager detained by the FBI on terrorism charges, only for Sekou to later die in a car bombing for which he is framed. Reda also represents Carrie in a court hearing with child services, who take her daughter Franny away after deeming Carrie a risk to her safety.

=== Sekou Bah ===
Played by J. Mallory McCree, Sekou Bah is a Muslim teenager living in New York City who alerts the FBI's attention after posting a series of online videos denouncing U.S. foreign policy in the Middle East and sympathizing with Al-Qaeda. Carrie works with her nonprofit to get Sekou released from jail. The next day, Sekou dies in an explosion from a bomb planted in his work van. He is publicly named as the perpetrator of the attack, but Carrie and Quinn discover that Dar Adal's cabal planted the bomb and framed Sekou.

=== Aby Bah ===
Played by Zainab Jah, Aby Bah is the mother of Sekou Bah and his sister Simone.

=== Simone Bah ===
Played by Ashlei Sharpe Chestnut, Simone Bah is the daughter of Aby Bah and the sister of Sekou Bah. She used to date Sekou's friend Saad, unaware that he is an FBI informant. Simone and Carrie later pressure Saad to admit he is an informant.

=== Saad Mahsud ===
Played by Leo Manzari, Saad Mahsud is a friend of Sekou Bah who secretly works as an informant for FBI agent Ray Conlin. After being arrested as part of gang roundup in Pittsburgh, Saad was recruited as an FBI informant and pressured into helping the FBI entrap Sekou on false charges. Carrie uses a recording of Conlin ordering Saad to entrap Sekou to secure Sekou's release, but Sekou then posts a video online outing Saad as an FBI informant. Saad later helps Conlin confirm that Sekou was not responsible for the car bombing in which he and two other civilians were killed.

=== Porteous Belli ===
Played by C.J. Wilson, Porteous Belli is the alias of a shadow operative working for Dar Adal's black ops group. He initially spies on Carrie from an apartment across the street from her. Quinn soon begins to suspect Belli and starts following him, learning he was responsible for planting the car bomb that killed Sekou Bah and two other civilians (for which Sekou was framed). Belli eventually goes rogue and ambushes Quinn and Astrid at a lakeside cabin, killing Astrid. Quinn confronts Dar, who learns that Belli was sent by a splinter faction within the black ops group. Quinn tracks Belli to a house used to plan black ops missions and watches the house from nearby. Belli ambushes Carrie when she investigates the house, but Quinn intervenes and brutally murders Belli as revenge for Astrid's death. He later finds evidence that Belli's black ops team, led by General McClendon, is planning to assassinate President-elect Keane.

=== Farhad Nafisi ===
Played by Bernard White, Farhad Nafisi is an Iranian banker who secretly worked as a Mossad asset. Saul interrogates him to learn about Iran's possible underground nuclear program, unaware that it was a ruse orchestrated by Mossad (alongside Dar Adal) to manipulate President-elect Keane's military policy. Majid Javadi eventually finds and tortures Nafisi into admitting that Iran has no underground program. Nafisi is later eliminated by Mossad.

=== Christine Lonas ===
Played by Marin Hinkle, Christine Lonas is a social worker dispatched by child services to take custody of Carrie's daughter Franny following a hostage situation at Carrie's home involving Quinn. Christine is later revealed to have received a tip regarding Franny's safety from Dar Adal. Carrie negotiates with Christine to reclaim custody of Franny. Christine later testifies at a custody hearing between Carrie and her sister Maggie regarding who should take care of Franny.

=== Sharon Aldright ===
Played by Lesli Margherita. Sharon Aldright is Brett O'Keefe's girlfriend and a producer on his show. Following President Keane's crackdown on anyone associated with the government after a failed assassination attempt, O'Keefe and Aldright go on the run, although they continue to transmit videos to the former's followers. O'Keefe and Sharon are taken to a safe house where he continues broadcasting and he meets a group of supporters who hang on his every word. Once Saul and his forces find them, and attempts to convince O'Keefe to come quietly fail, Sharon decides to cooperate and turns herself in.

=== Sam Paley ===
Played by Dylan Baker, Sam Paley is a United States senator leading an investigation into President Keane after her arrest of 200 federal employees. He initially works with Carrie to obtain insider information that will help his investigation. After the assassination of General Jamie McClendon, Paley subpoenas Simone Martin, girlfriend of chief of staff David Wellington, to testify before Congress. Carrie soon learns that her source, FBI agent Dante Allen, is a Russian asset (alongside Simone), working to sabotage the Keane administration by implicating Wellington in the McClendon assassination. Saul and Wellington disclose their findings on the Russian infiltration plot to a stunned Paley, who initially believes them, only to reverse course after Dante's death, believing Keane is using Russia as a scapegoat to cover up her own crimes. Paley amasses votes among Keane's staff to invoke the 25th Amendment to remove her from office. When Paley learns that Saul is on a mission to extract Simone from Russia, he allows his chief of staff to notify Russian ambassador Viktor Makarov to sabotage the mission, but acting president Ralph Warner forces Makarov to order Russian authorities to allow Saul and his team to leave the country, over Paley's protests. After Simone is successfully exfiltrated and testifies regarding the GRU's plot to bring down Keane, Paley is arrested as a co-conspirator for his attempts to stop the exfiltration. Keane visits him in prison; he begs for her amnesty for his family's sake, but she spits on him in contempt and leaves.

=== Janet Bayne ===
Played by Ellen Adair, Janet Bayne is Senator Sam Paley's chief of staff and trusted confidante. She and Paley help Carrie obtain information regarding President Keane's sweeping arrest of federal employees. Paley later informs Janet that the Russian government is working to undermine the Keane administration, but reneges after the death of FBI agent Dante Allen, a Russian mole who was set to be a key witness. Janet visits Clint Prower, an analyst on Saul's Russia task force, and threatens him into revealing that Saul and Carrie are on a mission to exfiltrate Simone Martin from Russia.

=== Bill Dunn ===
Played by Mackenzie Astin, Bill Dunn is Maggie Mathison's husband and Carrie's brother-in-law. An employee of the Keane administration, Bill frequently clashes with Carrie, who he increasingly views as a nuisance in his household. Bill and Maggie eventually take custody of Carrie's daughter Franny.

=== Simone Martin ===
Played by Sandrine Holt, Simone Martin is a captain in the GRU, Russia's intelligence agency, and a key player in their plot to sabotage the Keane administration. Simone makes a series of money transactions that enable the assassination of General Jamie McClendon in federal prison, and later attempts to testify in Congress implicating White House Chief of Staff David Wellington, her occasional lover, as the orchestrator. When Carrie and Saul learn of Simone's role in the Russians' subterfuge, they attempt to recover her from witness protection, but she is extracted by GRU operatives led by Yevgeny Gromov, her actual lover. Yevgeny sends Simone back to Russia, but Saul and Carrie manage to exfiltrate her back to the U.S. to testify about her role in the conspiracy.

=== Thomas Anson ===
Played by James D'Arcy, Thomas Anson is a former CIA field operative who worked with Carrie during her tenure as Kabul station chief. Anson and Carrie had an affair which led to the dissolution of his relationship, though the two remain friends. Carrie recruits Anson alongside a team of other former colleagues from the Middle East in a mission to uncover a Russian conspiracy to undermine President Keane's administration. Anson leads both efforts to track down Simone Martin (in Washington D.C. and later Russia), as well as helping find evidence of Dante Allen's role in the conspiracy. Carrie also has Anson steal files from Maggie Mathison's clinic attesting to her theft of psychiatric medication for Carrie, which Carrie plans to use as leverage in her custody battle with her sister regarding the care of her daughter Franny. However, Carrie ultimately decides against it.

=== Sandy Langmore ===
Played by Catherine Curtin, Sandy Langmore is a former CIA officer who was demoted to teaching at the academy after the leaked documents scandal in Berlin. Saul recruits Sandy, an expert on Russia, to his covert task force investigating a Russian conspiracy to sabotage the Keane administration.

=== Clint Prower ===
Played by Peter Vack, Clint Prower is a young but capable analyst from DARPA that Saul recruits to his task force to investigate Russian interference in the Keane administration. Clint is soon found and threatened by Senator Paley's chief of staff Janet Bayne into disclosing that Saul is on a mission to exfiltrate Simone Martin from Russia.

=== Ralph Warner ===
Played by Beau Bridges, Ralph Warner is the Vice President of the United States under President Elizabeth Keane, and later inherits the presidency following Keane's resignation. In season 8, only months into his tenure, Warner dies in a helicopter crash alongside Afghan President Daoud while returning from a combat outpost in Afghanistan where he announces the end of the war. The presidents' death becomes the focal point of a protracted standoff between the United States and Pakistan, until it is later revealed through the helicopter's flight recorder that the crash simply occurred due to a mechanical failure.

=== Viktor Makarov ===
Played by Elya Baskin, Viktor Makarov is Russia's ambassador to the United States. Saul negotiates with Viktor for Carrie's release after her detainment during the mission to exfiltrate Simone Martin. Saul later attempts to bargain with Viktor again for the flight recorder on President Warner's helicopter.

=== Sergei Mirov ===
Played by Merab Ninidze, Sergei Mirov is the head of the GRU and Yevgeny Gromov's superior. He is present at a diplomatic meeting between U.S. and Russian officials, which unbeknownst to him is a ruse to lure Yevgeny away from GRU captain Simone Martin so that she can be extracted to the U.S. to testify regarding her role in the Russian plot against President Keane. In season 8, Mirov keeps custody of the flight recorder on President Warner's crashed helicopter, sending Yevgeny to bargain for the identity of Saul's deeply-embedded asset in the Kremlin in exchange for the recorder. Mirov learns that his interpreter, Anna Pomerantseva, is in fact Saul's asset, and orders her arrest, but Anna commits suicide to avoid capture. Mirov then upholds Russia's end of the deal by announcing at a United Nations summit that the helicopter crash that killed Presidents Warner and Daoud was due to mechanical failure.

=== Abdul Qadir G'ulom ===
Played by Mohammad Bakri, General Abdul Qadir G'ulom is the Vice President (and later President) of Afghanistan. Known to be an aggressive, strongman leader, G'ulom's first act as president is to publicly blame Haissam Haqqani for the deaths of Presidents Warner and Daoud, then round up hundreds of Taliban prisoners in a stadium and threaten their execution unless Haqqani turns himself in. He persuades the inexperienced new U.S. President Benjamin Hayes into siding with his course of action. Once Haqqani turns himself in to American authorities, G'ulom arranges for a speedy trial in which Haqqani is sentenced to death, then executed by a firing squad.

=== Jenna Bragg ===
Played by Andrea Deck, Jenna Bragg is a young, novice CIA agent stationed in Kabul. Station chief Mike Dunne has her shadow Carrie, who he suspects of being a Russian asset. Jenna forms a bond with Carrie during her tenure in Kabul despite her suspicions about Carrie's allegiance.

While searching for the flight recorder from President Warner's helicopter, Carrie has Jenna disclose the location of a safehouse used by CIA operatives hunting Carrie and Yevgeny Gromov, lying to Jenna that she plans to turn herself in. She instead has Yevgeny arrange the operatives' arrest. Jenna, feeling betrayed, nonetheless implores Carrie not to disclose her aiding and abetting of Carrie's evasion of the CIA. When the American and Pakistani governments negotiate the operatives' release, Jenna travels to the Pakistan border to greet the soldiers. However, Jalal Haqqani sends one of his lieutenants to carry out a suicide bombing at the border, killing all the prisoners and injuring Jenna. Jenna returns to the U.S. to testify against Carrie in an FBI investigation, but relents and instead agrees to help Carrie track down Saul's Russian asset (whose identity the Russians are willing to trade for the flight recorder). After procuring a crucial lead for Carrie, Jenna decides to quit the CIA, disillusioned with the job for what it demands of her.

=== Mike Dunne ===
Played by Cliff Chamberlain, Mike Dunne is the CIA's station chief in Kabul during peace talks between the U.S. and Afghanistan. He is deeply suspicious of Carrie, who he believes may have been turned by the Russians. His suspicions are seemingly corroborated when Carrie lies about the contents of a discussion she had with Yevgeny Gromov out of the CIA's listening range. Carrie later turns herself in at the Kabul station, and Mike has her detained to an interrogation room before handing off the investigation to the FBI.

=== Jalal Haqqani ===
Played by Elham Ehsas, Jalal Haqqani is the last living son of Haissam Haqqani. Surrounded by war during his upbringing, Jalal is a firm believer in the Taliban's cause, and staunchly opposes his father's plans to broker peace with the U.S. After his father exiles him for conspiring with the ISI, Jalal is found and nursed back to health by ISI director-general Tasneem Qureishi. When the elder Haqqani is wrongly sentenced to death for causing the helicopter crash that killed Presidents Warner and Daoud, Jalal takes Max Piotrowski as a hostage to negotiate his father's release. When his father is executed, Jalal kills Max and takes control of the Taliban himself, falsely claiming credit for bringing down the helicopters and using his inflated credibility to significantly bolster the ranks of the Taliban. Tasneem attempts to persuade Jalal to go into hiding, but reverses course and decides to protect him after witnessing how large the Taliban has grown under his leadership. Jalal frequently clashes with Balach, one of his father's trusted lieutenants who advised him regarding peace in the region. He eventually punishes Balach by forcing him to carry out a suicide bombing at the Afghanistan-Pakistan border where a number of CIA operatives are being released from custody.

=== Balach ===
Played by Seear Kohi, Balach is one of Haissam Haqqani's most trusted lieutenants, and plays a key role in convincing him to seek an end to the war in Afghanistan. After Haqqani is executed by Afghan authorities, his son Jalal takes over the Taliban. The younger Haqqani's warmongering ways frequently put him at odds with Balach, who begrudgingly follows Balach's orders. Jalal eventually forces Balach to carry out a suicide attack on the Americans, threatening to murder his family if he does not comply. Balach reluctantly drives to the Afghanistan-Pakistan border where a number of CIA operatives are being released from custody, and detonates a bomb rigged to his car, killing all the operatives as well as himself.

=== Vanessa Kroll ===
Played by Karen Pittman, Vanessa Kroll is an FBI agent leading the task force investigating the death of President Warner. She arrives with a team in Kabul to survey the CIA station, and places Carrie under arrest when she turns herself in but refuses to cooperate with the investigation.

=== Benjamin Hayes ===
Played by Sam Trammell, Benjamin Hayes is the Vice President of the United States under Ralph Warner, having been selected from the opposing party in a show of bipartisanship. Hayes inherits the presidency following Warner's death in a helicopter crash. Impulsive and inexperienced, Hayes frequently makes decisions based on what would earn him the most political capital, which allows him to be easily manipulated.

When Afghan President Abdul Qadir G'ulom rounds up hundreds of Taliban prisoners in an attempt to draw out Haissam Haqqani, White House Chief of Staff David Wellington advises Hayes to talk down G'ulom. However, G'ulom manipulates the inexperienced Hayes into siding with his aggressive course of action. Hayes then hires John Zabel as his advisor on Afghanistan, but Zabel, eager to send the U.S. into another war in the Middle East, uses a leaked video of Jalal Haqqani claiming responsibility for President Warner's death to persuade Hayes into antagonizing Pakistan. The two countries reach the brink of war until it is proven that the President's helicopter crashed due to mechanical failure, forcing Hayes to stand down.

=== John Zabel ===
Played by Hugh Dancy, John Zabel is President Hayes' foreign policy advisor on Afghanistan, brought in following the death of President Warner. Despite his lack of experience in the military, Zabel is a brash and ardent advocate for war, and works to manipulate Hayes into escalating tensions with the Pakistan government in hopes of launching an invasion in the area. His plans are eventually thwarted when it is revealed that Warner's helicopter crashed due to a mechanical failure rather than an attack by the Taliban.

== Guest characters ==
The following is a list of guest characters who have appeared in one or two episodes of a season. The characters are listed in the order they were first credited in the series.

=== Prince Farid Bin Abbud ===
Played by Amir Arison, Prince Farid Bin Abbud is a Saudi Arabian prince who Lynne Reed was a consort for. He was seen talking to Abu Nazir and was thought to be connected to his terrorist network.

=== Afsal Hamid ===
Played by Waleed Zuaiter, Asfal "Affie" Hamid is an al-Qaeda fighter who was the sole survivor of the strike on the compound Brody was rescued from. He was Brody's guard during his captivity and frequently tortured and humiliated him. After Hamid is detained, Brody requests a face-to-face, during which Hamid provokes Brody into physically attacking him. Hamid later commits suicide in his cell using a razor blade, which Carrie suspects was slipped to him by Brody during their scuffle.

=== Issa Nazir ===
Played by Rohan Chand, Issa Nazir was Abu Nazir's young son, to whom Brody was assigned the job of teaching English. Brody came to develop a fatherly love for Issa, and later witnessed Issa's death in a drone strike ordered by V.P. Walden. Brody swore revenge on Walden for Issa's death and plotted to kill him a suicide attack upon return from his captivity.

=== Xander ===
Played by Taylor Kowalski, Xander is the former boyfriend of Dana whom she breaks up with after meeting Finn Walden.

=== Lynne Reed ===
Played by Brianna Brown, Lynne Reed works as a consort to Farid bin Abbud, a Saudi Arabian prince. Reed also is a CIA informant recruited by Carrie Mathison. She observes Farid meeting with Abu Nazir and reports it to Carrie, leading to a CIA investigation. Reed is eventually killed by an associate of Latif bin Walid (the prince's chief aide), who is involved in an al-Qaeda plot independent of the prince.

=== Larry ===
Played by James Urbaniak, Larry is the longtime administrator of the CIA's polygraph tests at their Langley headquarters.

=== Mansour Al-Zahrani ===
Played by Ramsey Faragallah, Mansour Al-Zahrani is a Saudi diplomat stationed in Washington D.C. He is also secretly affiliated with al-Qaeda and acts as a handler to Nicholas Brody and Tom Walker. He is discovered by the CIA and then killed in a bombing engineered by Walker.

=== Elizabeth Gaines ===
Played by Linda Purl, Elizabeth Gaines is Chief of Staff to Vice President William Walden and his most trusted advisor. She leads the effort to groom Brody into entering U.S. politics. She is assassinated by Tom Walker during the attack on the State Department.

=== Bassel ===
Played by Nasser Faris, Bassel is an Al-Qaeda bombmaker operating out of a clothing store in Gettysburg. He tailors the suicide vest worn by Brody in his planned attack on the Vice President. After the Gettysburg location is burned, Brody is sent by Abu Nazir's people to extract Bassel, but a paranoid Bassel attempts to escape, only to be killed by Brody in the ensuing struggle.

=== Fatima Ali ===
Played by Clara Khoury, Fatima Ali is married to Hezbollah district commander Abbas Ali, and a former asset of Carrie Mathison. She approaches the CIA with new information but is only willing to speak to Carrie, forcing the CIA to summon Carrie back into action. Carrie travels to Beirut to meet Fatima, who tells her that her husband plans to meet Abu Nazir in the coming days; in exchange, Carrie arranges safe passage for Fatima to the U.S. The CIA subsequently set up an ambush on Nazir at the meeting location, but the assassination is thwarted by Brody.

=== El Niño ===
Played by Manny Pérez, El Niño is the leader of a band of Venezuelan mercenaries who capture Brody after he is shot by Colombians crossing the border. El Niño and his men take him to the Tower of David, an aborted housing project in Caracas, where Brody is nursed back to health and given heroin to make him dependent on El Niño's men, forcing him to stay with them. He has a daughter named Esme (played by Martina Garcia) who accompanies Brody on an attempt to escape the tower.

=== Dr. Graham ===
Played by Erik Dellums, Dr. Graham is a resident of the Tower of David who treats Brody's gunshot wound and begins supplying him with heroin. He is implied to be a pedophile who lives in the slum due to social ostracism.

=== Leland Bennett ===
Played by Martin Donovan, Leland Bennett is a partner in a Washington, D.C. law firm who represents a bank that has ties to Iranian terrorists. Bennett attempts to convince Carrie to inform on the CIA for a client of his (who turns out to be Majid Javadi), which she agrees to in order to lure Javadi out.

=== Hafez Azizi ===
Played by Donnie Keshawarz, Hafez Azizi is the leader of a special operations team (US Army Special Forces) recruited by Saul to train Brody back to health and accompany him on his mission to kill Danesh Akbari in Tehran. He loses his leg in an IED explosion that hits his and Brody's car; Brody rescues him from the wreckage.

=== Danesh Akbari ===
Played by Houshang Touzie, General Danesh Akbari is the Intelligence Chief of Iran who Brody is sent to Tehran to kill. When the two meet in private, Akbari informs Brody that he and Abu Nazir discussed the latter's plans to turn Brody against his own country during the early days of Brody's capture. Brody reveals to Akbari that he was sent by the CIA to kill Akbari and replace him with Javadi; a stunned Akbari thanks Brody for telling him the truth, only for Brody to then bludgeon him with an ashtray and smother him to death with a pillow. Soon after, Brody is sentenced to death and hanged for his murder of Akbari, while Javadi inherits leadership of the IRGC.

=== Sandy Bachman ===
Played by Corey Stoll, Sandy Bachman is the CIA's station chief in Islamabad. He is responsible for sharing valuable intelligence that allows the CIA station in Kabul (led by Carrie) to target key sites belonging to Taliban leader Haissam Haqqani. Sandy, who is covertly trading state secrets for his information, leaves the station unprotected to meet with his classified source (later revealed to be Dennis Boyd). However, his photo is leaked to the Pakistani press, who identify him as the man responsible for a drone strike on a wedding that killed numerous civilians. Carrie and Quinn attempt to get Sandy off the streets, but a violent mob surrounds their vehicle and beats Sandy to death. Quinn later finds evidence that Sandy's murder was coordinated by the ISI.

=== Eden ===
Played by Emily Walker, Eden is Peter Quinn's landlady with whom he has a brief sexual relationship prior to his return to Islamabad. Quinn is arrested when he attacks two men in a bar for insulting Eden over her weight.

=== Ellen Mathison ===
Played by Victoria Clark, Ellen Mathison is the estranged mother of Carrie and Maggie Mathison. After the death of Frank Mathison, the girls' father, Maggie invites Ellen home to mourn her ex-husband, but Carrie rebuffs her mother and has her leave. Carrie later tracks down Ellen in Nebraska (where she works as a schoolteacher) and demands to know why she abandoned her family. Ellen admits that it was her serial adultery, not Frank's bipolar disorder, that made her leave, and reassures Carrie that her condition does not prevent her from sustaining a healthy relationship.

=== Joe Crocker ===
Played by John Getz, Joe Crocker is the United States Secretary of State to President Morse. At the end of season 4, Saul meets with him asking to be rehired at the CIA, but Crocker warns him that the video of Saul's captivity under Haissam Haqqani would derail his standing. Crocker is present during a CIA briefing at the start of season 5, where he presses Peter Quinn on the U.S.' strategy in Syria against ISIS, only for Quinn to counter that there is no coherent U.S. strategy, and that ordering special-ops missions will not make for a lasting solution against Islamic extremism. After jihadists in Berlin announce a sarin attack on the city unless the Islamic State is formally recognized, Crocker refuses Saul's request to issue a warning across the city, arguing that terrorist threats are a "new normal" and do not always warrant a mass panic. After the inauguration of president Elizabeth Keane, Crocker is among the second wave of mass arrests of intelligence community members, ordered by Keane in retaliation for an assassination attempt against her. Saul later negotiates the release of everyone swept up in the second wave of arrests.

=== General Youssef ===
Played by Yigal Naor, General Youssef is a Syrian military official who Saul convinces to take over the Syrian presidency after a planned CIA coup against Bashar al-Assad. However, Youssef is killed on his way out of Germany in an airplane explosion engineered by the Russians.

=== Tova Rivlin ===
Played by Hadar Ratzon-Rotem, Tova Rivlin is a Mossad agent. In Berlin, she and Etai Luskin help Saul fake his defection to Israel to protect him from being apprehended on false pretenses by the CIA. She and Dar Adal later conspire to mislead Saul (and by extension, President-elect Keane) that Iran is running a parallel nuclear program with North Korea.

=== Ahmed Nazari ===
Played by Darwin Shaw, Ahmed Nazari is an Iraqi lawyer and a former asset of Allison Carr in Baghdad during the Iraq War. In 2008, Allison, who was completing her post in Iraq, introduced Ahmed to Carrie as his new handler, but Ahmed, who was in love with Allison, refused to report to anyone but her. Ahmed later revealed to Allison that he had been stealing millions of dollars from the Ministry of Justice and asked her to run away with him; Allison accepted, only for Ahmed to be revealed as a Russian asset who entrapped Allison on behalf of the SVR, who blackmailed her into becoming a double agent for Russia. In the present, Carrie tracks down Ahmed, who she believed to be dead, to Amsterdam, where he is living under a new identity with Russian protection.

=== President Morse ===
Played by Alan Dale, President Morse is Elizabeth Keane's predecessor.

=== Clarice ===
Played by Mickey O'Hagan, Clarice is a prostitute that Quinn befriends while recovering from his stroke in New York. She later takes Carrie to meet Quinn at his stakeout of the house used by Dar Adal's black ops team. Mickey O'Hagan followed that with a recurring role on Showtime's Homeland (2016) as Clarice, a sneaky, not very bright bad girl, and sneaky confidant to Quinn's (Rupert Friend).

=== Dorit ===
Played by Jacqueline Antaramian, Dorit is Saul Berenson's sister and an Israeli settler in the West Bank. Though she and Saul are largely estranged, Dorit still cares deeply about her brother. Saul visits Dorit after 12 years as cover to meet with the Iranians. Carrie later visits her, lying to her that Saul has died as a ruse to receive Saul's "legacy plan" to pass on the identity of his Russian asset to Carrie. Indeed, Dorit has a USB given to her by Saul, which contains a video message from him disclosing the asset's identity to Carrie. Dorit travels to the U.S. after giving Carrie the USB, believing her brother to have died. The two reconnect over the next two years, and she helps Saul move out of his residence in Washington D.C.

=== Samira Noori ===
Played by Sitara Attaie, Samira Noori is a resident of Kabul whose husband was killed in a car bomb intended for her after she campaigned against General G'ulom's regime. Carrie finds Samira's collection of evidence attesting to G'ulom's embezzlement of government funds, and uses it to leverage G'ulom into supporting peace talks between the U.S. and Afghanistan. Carrie later rescues Samira from being kidnapped by her brother-in-law, who attempts to forcibly marry her after the death of her husband.

=== Anna Pomerantseva ===
Played by Tatyana Mukha, Anna Pomerantseva is the head interpreter for the GRU, and Saul's longtime asset inside the Kremlin. A former English teacher in East Berlin, Anna volunteered to become Saul's spy in 1986 after her entire cadet class was executed because their classmate, Andrei Kuznetsov, defected to the U.S. with Saul's aid. She spends over two decades passing state secrets to Saul while rising the ranks of the Kremlin, using handwritten messages hidden inside the bindings of red leather books to communicate with Saul under an alias. Carrie is eventually forced to give Anna's identity to the Russians in exchange for the flight recorder that proves that President Warner's helicopter crashed due to a mechanical failure, which would avert a war between the U.S. and Pakistan. Saul calls Anna to warn her that the Russians have her identity, but she kills herself to avoid being captured. Two years later, Carrie takes over Anna's role as Saul's mole inside the Kremlin, using Anna's same tradecraft to pass vital information to Saul. Julie Engelbrecht plays a young Anna in flashbacks.

=== Kamasi Washington ===
Kamasi Washington appears as himself onstage with members of West Coast Get Down, who he introduces individually by name (some are credited). Carrie and Yevgeny Gromov are a couple in the audience.
