= A Flash of Light (Homeland) =

- Homeland episode
- Episode no.: Season 6 Episode 4
- Directed by: Lesli Linka Glatter
- Written by: Patrick Harbinson
- Production code: 6WAH04
- Original air date: February 12, 2017
- Running time: 51 minutes

Guest appearances
- Hill Harper as Rob Emmons; Allan Corduner as Etai Luskin; Patrick Sabongui as Reda Hashem; C.J. Wilson as Porteous Belli; J. Mallory McCree as Sekou Bah; Jacqueline Antaramian as Dorit; Zainab Jah as Mrs. Bah; Ashlei Sharpe Chestnut as Simone Bah; James Mount as Agent Thoms; Jacinto Taras Riddick; Shaun Toub as Majid Javadi

Episode chronology
← Previous "The Covenant"	Next → "Casus Belli"
- Homeland season 6

"A Flash of Light" is the fourth episode of the sixth season of the American television drama series Homeland, and the 64th episode overall. It premiered on Showtime on February 12, 2017.

== Plot ==
The man Saul (Mandy Patinkin) has arranged to meet in secret is IRGC general Majid Javadi (Shaun Toub). Saul asks Javadi to use his resources to investigate Nafisi and his possible dealings with North Korea. The next day, as Saul is preparing to go back to the United States, he is picked up by Israeli ambassador Etai Luskin (Allan Corduner). Etai has received word that a senior Iranian official crossed the border into the West Bank, which is where Saul was known to be. Wanting more information on the meeting, Etai has Saul detained.

Sekou (J. Mallory McCree) is greeted with a surprise party as he returns home. His friends, suspicious of how he got off so clean, probe him with questions as to whether he had to turn informant. In response, Sekou posts a new video on the internet in which he exposes the true identity of FBI informant Saad Masoud. Carrie (Claire Danes) immediately goes to visit Sekou and pleads with him to take down the video, as it would surely nullify the deal she made to get Sekou released. Carrie eventually convinces Sekou after alluding to the highly risky measures that were taken on her part to secure the deal.

Quinn (Rupert Friend) continues to keep watch on the neighbor across the street, going so far as to break into the man's apartment while he is out. He finds a room seemingly staged for surveillance, leading him to believe that the man is spying on Carrie. When the neighbor is picked up by a car in the middle of the night, Quinn follows him in Carrie's car. Quinn watches and takes pictures as the man is dropped off at Medina Medley, Sekou's workplace.

Heeding Carrie's advice, Keane (Elizabeth Marvel) has opted not to take immediate action against Iran. The newspapers pick up a story on how Keane has information on Iran's nuclear program and is not responding. Keane lashes out at Dar (F. Murray Abraham), whom she accuses of planting the story. Keane then asks Carrie to volunteer some inside knowledge about Dar that they could use as leverage on him, but Carrie is reticent, not wanting to betray trust to that extent. Dar confronts Carrie on the street, telling her to stop giving Keane "bad advice," as Carrie is out of the agency and no longer has pertinent information on the affairs she's advising on.

Sekou, now back at work, hears beeping in the back of his delivery van as he drives through New York. The van explodes. Etai tells Saul, "You're needed back home. There's been an attack in New York."

== Production ==
The episode was written by executive producer Patrick Harbinson and directed by executive producer Lesli Linka Glatter.

== Reception ==
=== Reviews ===
The episode received a rating of 100% with an average score of 8.1 out of 10 on the review aggregator Rotten Tomatoes, with the site's consensus stating "'A Flash of Light' ties together loose plot threads and sees key dynamics shift in the most engaging hour of the season thus far".

Ben Travers of IndieWire gave the episode an 'A−' grade, and wrote that the episode "felt focused, lean, and emotionally honest" and that it "was filled with heated debates. Each tête-à-tête built to the next, pacing the episode and elevating tension, while Quinn's solo operation set up the ending under a shroud of mystery". Aaron Riccio of Slant Magazine, in regards to the climactic car bombing incident, said "Patrick Harbinson's script is designed to give every scene, every bit of dialogue, a new layer in the light of those last two minutes... Homeland leaves it to us to leap to our own conclusions, to figure out who to blame for this act of terror".

Joshua Alston of The A.V. Club gave the episode a B−, likening it to the fourth installments of previous seasons in which a significant plot development occurred. He wrote, "Indeed, “A Flash Of Light” is that galvanizing episode, right down to the “unexpected” explosion that changes the trajectory of all the characters and heightens the stakes. It feels all too familiar, like a color-by-numbers episode of post-Brody Homeland." He similarly criticized the scenes involving President-elect Keane, calling them "dramatically inert" and remarking that "the dialogue sounds like entire chunks of the background interviews have been shoehorned into the characters’ mouths."

=== Ratings ===
The original broadcast was watched by 1.05 million viewers.
