= Sidabrinė gervė 2024 =

Lithuanian film award

The 15th Sidabrinė gervė Awards ceremony for year 2023 took place at the Lithuanian State Symphony Orchestra Concert Hall on June 9, 2024, where 21 "Silver Cranes" and one "Golden Crane" were presented.

== Awards ==
- BEST STUDENT WORK OF THE YEAR

Numeris vienas (Number One) (dir. Milda Augustaitytė, prod. Milda Augustaitytė, Ingrida Danilovaitė, LMTA)

- BEST MAKEUP ARTIST WORK OF THE YEAR

Eglė Mikalauskaitė Gricienė (Čiulbanti siela, Chirping Soul)

- BEST COSTUME DESIGNER OF THE YEAR

Agnė Rimkutė (Čiulbanti siela, Chirping Soul)

- BEST FILM DESIGNER OF THE YEAR

Algirdas Garbačiauskas (Čiulbanti siela, Chirping Soul)

- BEST SOUND DIRECTOR'S WORK OF THE YEAR

Saulius Urbanavičius (Čiulbanti siela, Chirping Soul)

- BEST EDITORIAL WORK OF THE YEAR

Silvija Vilkaitė (Tu man nieko neprimeni, You remind me of nothing, English title: Slow)

- BEST COMPOSER'S WORK OF THE YEAR

Misha Skalskis (Čiulbanti siela, Chirping Soul)

- BEST OPERATOR'S WORK OF THE YEAR

Eitvydas Doškus (Čiulbanti siela,, Chirping Soul)

- BEST SUPPORTING ACTRESS OF THE YEAR

Hadar Ratzon-Rotem (Five and a Half Love Stories in a Vilnius Apartment)

- BEST SUPPORTING ACTOR OF THE YEAR

Darius Meškauskas (Mano laisvė, My Freedom)

- BEST ACTOR OF THE YEAR
- Greta Grinevičiūtė (Tu man nieko neprimeni, You remind me of nothing, English title: Slow)
- BEST ACTOR OF THE YEAR

Kęstutis Cicėnas (Tu man nieko neprimeni, You remind me of nothing, English title: Slow)

- BEST SHORT FILM OF THE YEAR

Tušinukas, The Ballpoint Pen (dir. Adas Burkšaitis, produced by Kotryna Ramanauskaitė, Greta Akcijonaitė, Greta Garbo Films)

- BEST ANIMATED FILM OF THE YEAR

Ta, kuri žino, The One Who Knows (dir. Eglė Davidavičė, prod. Agnė Adomėnė, Art Shot)

1*BEST MINORITY CO-PRODUCTION FILM OF THE YEAR

Kaimiečiai, Villagers (dir. DK Welchman, Hugh Welchman, prod. ART SHOT, Breakthru Films, Digitalkraft)

- BEST SCREENPLAYER OF THE YEAR

Maria Kavtaradze (Tu man nieko neprimeni, You remind me of nothing, English title: Slow)

- BEST DIRECTOR'S WORK OF THE YEAR
- Maria Kavtaradze (Tu man nieko neprimeni, You remind me of nothing, English title: Slow)
- BEST FEATURE DOCUMENTARY FILM OF THE YEAR

Mamutų medžioklė Mammoth Hunt (dir. Aistė Stonytė, prod. Studio Nominum, Arūnas Matelis, Algimantė Matelienė)

- BEST FEATURE FILM OF THE YEAR

Tu man nieko neprimeni, You remind me of nothing, English title: Slow (dir. Marija Kavtaradze, prod. Marija Razgutė, M-Films, Luisa Romeo, Frida Films, Anna Maria Kantarius, Garagefilm)

- AWARD FOR THE DISSEMINATION OF CINEMA CULTURE

Lithuanian Short Film Agency "Lithuanian Shorts"

- LIFETIME ACHIEVEMENT AWARD "GOLDEN CRANE"

Film critic Živilė Pipinytė

- THE MOST VIEWED FILM OF THE YEAR

Milijonieriaus palikimas, The Millionaire's Inheritance, dir. Tadas Vidmantas, prod. Mantvidas Žalėnas, Deividas Misiulis
