= Hadar Ratzon-Rotem =

Israeli actress

- הדר רצון-רותם
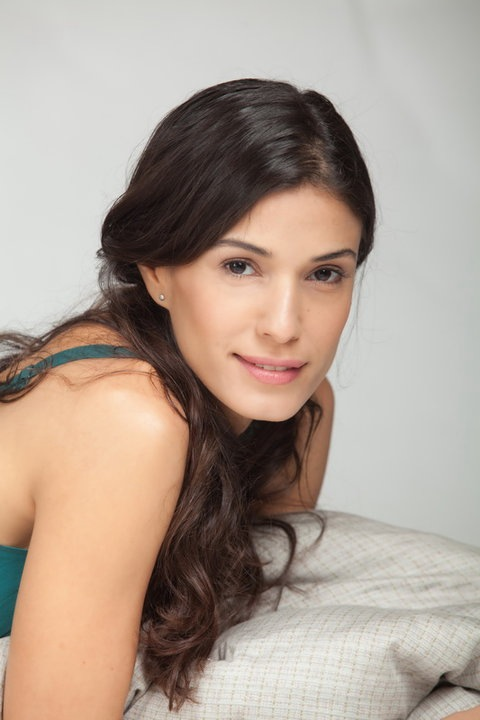
- Ratzon-Rotem in 2012
- Born: Hadar Ratzon; 22 February 1978 (age 48); Jerusalem, Israel
- Spouse: Yair Rotem (m. 2009)
- Children: 2

Hadar Ratzon-Rotem (Hebrew: הדר רצון-רותם) is an Israeli actress.

== Early life ==
Hadar Ratzon was born in Jerusalem, Israel, to a family of Mizrahi Jewish (Yemenite-Jewish) descent. She grew up in Hod HaSharon, Israel. Ratzon graduated from Yoram Loewenstein Performing Arts Studio at the age of 28.

Ratzon-Rotem participated in several student films, including Ticking Bomb by Atar Ofek (Kinneret Academic College) and Here Lies the Dog by Shahar Hadad (The College of Theater Puppetry).

In 2007, she was cast in the American political thriller film Rendition, directed by Academy Award winner Gavin Hood. In the film, she portrayed the partner of Jake Gyllenhaal, appearing alongside Meryl Streep, Alan Arkin, and Reese Witherspoon, as well as Israeli actors Igal Naor and Raymond Amsalem. That same year, she also performed in the youth play What a Youth, written and directed by Hagit Rechavi Nikolayevsky. In 2008, she returned to the Yoram Loewenstein Studio as a guest alumna to play Jennifer in Ray Cooney's Two and Two Make Sex, directed by Roni Mendelson. That year, she co-founded a sketch comedy group called "Six Sitting," which performed original material at the Tzavta theater.

In 2009, she appeared in the German production Your Soul, a film based on Batya Gur's book Murder in Bethlehem, directed by Peter Patzak. She played Zohara Bashari alongside Geula Nuni, Gabi Amrani, Dvir Benedek, and Galit Giat. That same year, she participated in the Haredi production Sand Tears, directed by Rechi Elias. In 2010, she was cast in the lead role of the musical Sigal at the Yoram Loewenstein Studio, directed by Tsedi Tsarfati. The musical follows the stormy romance between Aris San and Aliza Azikri. Ratzon-Rotem played the lead role opposite Erez Regev. Due to the musical demands of the role, she trained for several months with vocal coach Riki Bogatin. The production was a major success and was acquired by the Habima Theatre; Ratzon-Rotem and Regev retained their lead roles in the professional production alongside Rotem Abuhav, Guy Zu-Aretz, and Shlomi Koriat.

In 2011, she also appeared in the Habima production of Neither by Day nor by Night by Avraham Raz, directed by Roi Horovitz, starring alongside Lia Koenig. In 2012, she filmed an episode for the long-running Polish series For Better and for Worse. In September 2012, she starred in the pilot episodes of the series Tel Aviviyot on Channel 10, a show inspired by Sex and the City co-starring Hila Vidor and Neta Plotnik. Between 2012 and 2015, Ratzon-Rotem appeared in several high-profile television series. She played a role in the second season of the thriller Prisoners of War (Hatufim) and the first season of the American series Tyrant, both created by Gideon Raff. In 2015, she appeared in the second season of The Gordin Cell and guest-starred in the American series Homeland as Tova.

In 2019, she gained international recognition for portraying Nadia Cohen, the wife of Israeli spy Eli Cohen, in the Netflix miniseries The Spy, created by Gideon Raff and starring Sacha Baron Cohen. In 2021, she participated in the drama series The Gendarmerie (HaShotrim), based on the "avenging cops" affair, alongside Tsahi Halevi and Shani Cohen. In 2025, she played police officer Mali in the Kan 11 thriller series Jaffa.

== Selected filmography ==
- 2007: Rendition, American politica thriller
- 2011: Prisoners of War (TV series), Season 2 (guest appearance)
- 2015: All About Allison, Season 6, episode 8 of Homeland (guest appearance)
- 2017: In Homeland, season 6, she played the Mossad agent Tova.
- 2019: She played Nadia, the wife of Eli Cohen, in the television series The Spy.
- 2023: Five and a Half Love Stories in a Vilnius Apartment

== Awards ==
"Best supporting actor" at the Sidabrinė gervė 2024 awards for her role in the film Five and a Half Love Stories in a Vilnius Apartment.
