= J. Mallory McCree =

American actor

- Born: July 18, 1986 (age 40); Detroit, Michigan
- Occupation: Actor
- Years active: 2009–present

Jamal Mallory McCree is an American actor. He is best known for his portrayal of Charlie Price in the ABC thriller Quantico and as Sekou Bah in the Showtime television series Homeland.

== Biography ==
J. Mallory McCree is a native of Detroit, Michigan. After graduating from Rutgers University and earning a bachelor's degree from the Mason Gross School of the Arts, McCree moved to New York. Soon after, he booked roles in New York's premiere off-broadway houses such as Signature Theatre and Playwright's Horizons. After acquiring a strong background in theatre, McCree has broken through to film and television. He guest starred on shows such as Quantico, Law & Order, Blue Bloods, Code Black, Homeland and The Defenders as well as appearing in films such as Cloned, No One Asked Me and From Nowhere.

== Personal life ==
He is engaged to fellow actor Angela Lewis.

== Filmography ==
=== Film ===
Year	Title	Role	Notes
2009	We Need to Talk About Kevin	Prison Boy	
2011	White Sugar in a Black Pot	Junior Mackey	Short
2011	Real Talk	Iggy	Short
2012	Cloned: The Recreator Chronicles	Derek Johnson / Derek 2	
2012	Dark Horse	Anthony	TV movie
2013	The Last Keepers	Gavin	
2013	Black Nativity	Kyle	
2013	You Know Me	Joshua	Short
2014	Sugar	Terry	Short
2016	Nowhere	Moussa	
2017	Who We Are Now		
2018	Mr. Talented	Mr. Talented	Short
Post-production	Lolita Express	Tiger	short

=== Television ===
Year	Title	Role	Notes
2009	Law & Order	Rodney	Episodes: Bailout
2015	Show Me a Hero	Skip	2 episodes
2015	Code Black	Jamal	
2015–2016	Quantico	Charlie Price	6 episodes
2016	Law & Order: Special Victims Unit	Ronnie Ellis	Episode: Forty-One Witnesses
2017	Homeland	Sekou Bah	4 episodes
2017	The Defenders	Cole Miller	3 episodes
2018	The Crossover: The Story of Laurence Moses Bryant	J. Mallory (barber)	
2018	Payroll	Cam	
2018	The Last Ship	Marine Doc / Marine	5 episodes
2019–2021	Good Trouble	Dom Williams	Recurring (Seasons 1–3)
2022	Grey's Anatomy	Arthur Kyat	1 episode (season 18 episode: Legacy)
