= List of Washington Redskins name change advocates =

For decades, hundreds of organizations and individuals advocated that the American football team formerly known as the Washington Redskins should change its name and logo. In July 2020, following a wave of racial awareness and reforms in wake of national protests after the murder of George Floyd, major sponsors of the league and team threatened to stop supporting them until the name was changed. As a result, the team initiated a review of the name and decided to retire it and the logo, temporarily playing as the Washington Football Team pending adoption of a permanent name. The new name, Washington Commanders, was announced on February 2, 2022.

The team was one of the leading examples of the Native American mascot controversy, as the Redskins name itself is defined as derogatory or insulting in American English dictionaries. The issue is often discussed in the media in terms of offensiveness or political correctness, which reduces it to feelings and opinions, and prevents full understanding of the historical, psychological and sociological context provided by academic research on the negative effects of the use of Native American names and images by sports teams. As of 2010, over 115 professional organizations representing civil rights and scientific experts published resolutions or policies stating that the use of Native American names and symbols by non-native sports teams is a harmful form of ethnic stereotyping that promotes racial prejudice.

Since its founding in 1944, the National Congress of American Indians (NCAI) has campaigned to eliminate negative stereotyping of Native American peoples in the media. Over time, the campaign began to focus on Indian names and mascots in sports. The NCAI maintains that teams with mascots such as the Braves and the Redskins perpetuate negative stereotypes of Native American people, and demean their native traditions and rituals. The NCAI issued a report in 2013 summarizing opposition to Indian mascots and team names generally, and the Washington Redskins in particular. In the trademark case, the Trademark Trial and Appeal Board placed significance on the NCAI opposition, estimating that the organization represented about 30% of the Native American population at the time the trademarks were granted, which met their criteria for a "substantial composite" of Native Americans finding the name disparaging.

Although the Washington name change has eliminated the focus on one team, efforts to remove Native American mascots in general has been sustained, with special attention on high school teams that continue to be Redskins.

== Native Americans ==
The following groups passed resolutions or issued statements regarding their opposition to the name of the Washington NFL team:

=== Tribes ===
- Affiliated Tribes of Northwest Indians
- Cherokee Nation of Oklahoma
- Comanche Nation of Oklahoma
- The Confederated Tribes of the Colville Reservation (Washington)
- Grand Traverse Band of Ottawa and Chippewa Indians (Michigan)
- Hoh Indian Tribe
- Inter Tribal Council of Arizona
- Inter-Tribal Council of the Five Civilized Tribes
- Little River Band of Ottawa Indians (Michigan)
- Match-E-Be-Nash-She-Wish Band of Pottawatomi Indians, Gun Lake Tribe (Michigan)
- Menominee Tribe of Indians (Wisconsin)
- Navajo Nation Council
- Oneida Indian Nation (New York)
- Oneida Tribe of Indians of Wisconsin
- Osage Nation
- Penobscot Nation
- Poarch Band of Creek Indians
- Rosebud Sioux (South Dakota)
- Samish Indian Nation (Washington)
- Sault Ste. Marie Tribe of Chippewa Indians (Michigan)
- Shoshone-Bannock Tribes (Idaho)
- Standing Rock Sioux Tribe (North Dakota)
- The Three Affiliated Tribes of the Fort Berthold Indian Reservation (North Dakota)
- United South and Eastern Tribes (USET)
- Yocha Dehe Wintun Nation (Northern California)

=== Organizations ===
- Advocates for American Indian Children (California)
- American Indian College Fund
- American Indian High Education Consortium
- American Indian Mental Health Association (Minnesota)
- American Indian Movement
- American Indian Opportunities Industrialization Center of San Bernardino County
- American Indian Student Services at the Ohio State University
- Americans for Indian Opportunity
- Association on American Indian Affairs
- Buncombe County Native American Inter-tribal Association (North Carolina)
- Capitol Area Indian Resources (Sacramento, CA)
- Concerned American Indian Parents (Minnesota)
- The Confederated Tribes of the Colville Reservation
- Council for Indigenous North Americans (University of Southern Maine)
- Eagle and Condor Indigenous Peoples' Alliance
- First Peoples Worldwide
- Fontana Native American Indian Center, Inc. (California)
- Governor's Interstate Indian Council
- Great Lakes Inter-Tribal Council (Wisconsin)
- Greater Tulsa Area Indian Affairs Commission
- HONOR – Honor Our Neighbors Origins and Rights
- Juaneño Band of Mission Indians (California)
- Kansas Association for Native American Education
- Maryland Commission on Indian Affairs
- Medicine Wheel Inter-tribal Association (Louisiana)
- Minnesota Indian Education Association
- National Congress of American Indians (NCAI)
- National Indian Child Welfare Association
- National Indian Education Association
- National Indian Youth Council
- National Native American Law Student Association
- Native American Caucus of the California Democratic Party
- Native American Finance Officers Association (NAFOA)
- Native American Indian Center of Central Ohio
- Native American Journalists Association
- Native American Rights Fund (NARF)
- Native Voice Network
- Nebraska Commission on Indian Affairs
- North Carolina Commission of Indian Affairs
- North Dakota Indian Education Association
- Not Your Mascots, Inc.
- Nottawaseppi Huron Band of Potawatomi (Michigan)
- Office of Native American Ministry, Diocese of Grand Rapids (Michigan)
- Ohio Center for Native American Affairs
- San Bernardino/Riverside Counties Native American Community Council
- Seminole Nation of Oklahoma
- Society of American Indian Government Employees (SAIGE)
- Society of Indian Psychologists of the Americas
- Southern California Indian Center
- St. Cloud State University – American Indian Center
- Tennessee Chapter of the National Coalition for the Preservation of Indigenous Cultures
- Tennessee Commission of Indian Affairs
- Tennessee Native Veterans Society
- Tulsa Indian Coalition Against Racism
- Unified Coalition for American Indian Concerns, Virginia
- The United Indian Nations of Oklahoma
- Virginia American Indian Cultural Resource Center
- WIEA "Indian" Mascot and Logo Taskforce (Wisconsin)
- Wisconsin Indian Education Association
- Woodland Indian Community Center-Lansing (Michigan)
- Youth "Indian" Mascot and Logo Task Force (Wisconsin)

After accepting $200,000 from the Washington Redskins Original Americans Foundation for the prior year, the Indian National Finals Rodeo (INFR), which says it is the U.S.' and Canada's largest rodeo organization for Native Americans, sent a letter refusing any further donations. INFR Vice President Michael Bo Vocu stated, "After much soul searching, we have decided that we cannot in good conscience accept resources from you on the terms you have offered, no matter how desperately we need it ... because, as you know, the resources you are offering are not truly philanthropic -- they come with the expectation that we will support the racial slur that continues to promote your associated professional football team's name." The previous year, the Redskins primary logo appeared at many Native rodeo events, creating a backlash from those offended by it.

=== Individuals ===
Interviews at a powwow in Towson, Maryland, found several Native Americans who favored a change of the Redskins name.

These Native Americans put their opposition to the Redskins' name on the public record:

- Sherman Alexie (Spokane, author): "Most, you know, at least half the country thinks the mascot issue is insignificant. But I think it's indicative of the ways in which Indians have no cultural power."
- Bruce Anderson (Coquille people): "I challenge [owner Dan Snyder] to focus on winning ... but also an opportunity for me to simply sit with my grandchildren to watch my former team without having to cut through the racial stereotypes."
- Allen Barbre (Tunica-Biloxi), a Philadelphia Eagles player, refuses to use the name of the Washington team.
- Irene Bedard (Inupiat, Inuit and Métis, actress): She's really upset about some of the costumes the cheerleaders have worn through the years -- calling them over sexualized and "degrading" to proud Native American women like herself.
- Notah Begay (Navajo, PGA pro golfer) called the Redskins' name "a very clear example of institutionalized degradation of an ethnic minority."
- Clyde Bellecourt (Ojibwe, co-founder of the American Indian Movement)
- Bob Burns (Blackfeet elder)
- Ben Nighthorse Campbell (Northern Cheyenne, U.S. Senator)
- Gregg Deal (Paiute Tribe of Pyramid Lake, artist/activist, and DC Area resident): "People aren't just emboldened by their team to treat poorly those of us that would oppose such "honor." They are actually empowered in being aggressive to the point of assault, verbal or physical, threatened or made good. I live in a world where I must coach my children not to talk about such things publicly in school because a classmate may come at them, or even a teacher. The threat of aggression because of who we are is real and enabled by the Washington Redskins. That is not a complaint; that is the truth."
- Vine Deloria, Jr. (Sioux, historian/author)
- Jim Enote (Zuni), director of the A:shiwi A:wan Museum and Heritage Center in New Mexico
- Louise Erdrich (Chippewa, novelist/poet) – "It's more than a stereotype, it's an insult, and they don't have to perpetuate it."
- Donna Fann-Boyle (Choctaw/Cherokee, activist)
- Claudia Fox Tree (Arawak, teacher) – "It's part of a much larger issue in that those sort of depictions are our only representation in modern America. It isn't just the sin of stereotypes and misinformation, it's the sin of absence – of not seeing yourself or the people you come from anywhere, of not seeing any contemporary images."
- Stephanie Fryberg, Phd. (Tulalip, Professor of American Indian Studies and Psychology at the University of Washington)
- Kevin Gover (Pawnee, director of The Smithsonian Institution's National Museum of the American Indian)
- Suzan Shown Harjo (Cheyenne/Hodulgee Muscogee, author/activist)
- Tara Houska (Ojibwe/Couchiching First Nation, attorney/activist)
- Adrienne Keene (Cherokee Nation of Oklahoma, Assistant Professor of American Studies and Ethnic Studies at Brown University)
- Bronson Koenig (Ho-Chunk Nation, Wisconsin Badgers guard)
- Litefoot (Cherokee/Chichimeca, rapper) ironically celebrates Native American team names as "recreational genocide" on the track 'Stereotipik'.
- Dana Lone Hill (Oglala Lakota Sioux, writer): The refusal to rename the Redskins is far worse than Donald Sterling's racist remarks.
- Russell Means (Oglala Lakota, activist/actor)
- Billy Mills (Sioux, Olympic gold medal winner)
- David Narcomey (Seminole Nation of Oklahoma)
- Ted Nolan (First Nations Ojibway, NHL player and coach)
- Cornel Pewewardy (Comanche-Kiowa, Professor of Education at Portland State University)
- Buford Rolin (Creek tribal chairman)
- Gyasi Ross (Blackfeet Nation/Suquamish Territories, author/attorney): Regarding team supporters citing larger issue faced by Native Americans than a team name, "Native people shouldn't be forced to choose between living or racial discrimination. Those are false binaries."
- Shoni Schimmel (Umatilla, Louisville Cardinals guard, class of 2015)
- Charlene Teters (Spokane, artist/lecturer)
- Summer Wesley (Choctaw attorney, writer, and activist)
- W. Richard West Jr. (Cheyenne, President of the Autry National Center in Los Angeles): Redskin is "an openly derogatory term. It always is and it always has been." West also characterizes the Original American's Foundation as an "attempt to divert attention from the fact that his team's nickname is coming under increasing heat from people who think it's an offensive racial term."
- Ray Young Bear (Meskwaki, author)

== Civil rights and religious organizations ==
- Anti-Defamation League
- Central Conference of American Rabbis
- Fritz Pollard Alliance
- Leadership Conference on Civil and Human Rights, a coalition of over 200 individual organizations
- NAACP
- Religious Action Center of Reform Judaism
- Seattle Human Rights Commission
- United Church of Christ General Synod

== Politicians and government agencies ==
In 2015 a Native American parent, with the support of the local Native American Bar Association, asked the school board of Montgomery County, Maryland to amend the dress code to ban students or staff from wearing clothing bearing the name or logo of any Native American mascot in any county school. The problem was presented as stereotypes promoted by mascots, but special mention was made of the name Redskins being a slur. A school board spokesman stated that previous complaints had been made, but were handled individually.

=== Political opinion ===
Statements by political figures have generally been expressions of personal opinion rather than recommendations for government action. There have also been non-binding resolutions proposed in New Jersey and passed in Minneapolis, New York State and California.

Although the majority of those who advocated a name change are Democrats, there is no indication that the issue is of any real significance in electoral decisions given that Native Americans are such a small percentage of the electorate and are not likely to influence the outcome of any election. There are only eight states where Natives make up greater than 2 percent of the population: Alaska, Arizona, Montana, New Mexico, North Dakota, Oklahoma, South Dakota and Wyoming. However, polls show a definite political difference in the opinion of the general public, with only 58% of Democrats opposing a name change versus 89% of Republicans.

The topic came up in a 2013 interview of President Barack Obama, who stated that if he were the owner of the Redskins, he would consider changing the name because it offends many Native Americans, but that he didn't "have a stake" in the issue as he is not an owner of a professional sports team. In direct response Lanny Davis repeated the team position that no offense is intended to Native Americans, and refers to both the 2004 poll and a recent AP poll that show a large majority of people nationally support the continued use of the name. However, in November, 2015 Obama, speaking at the White House Tribal Nations Conference, stated, "Names and mascots of sports teams like the Washington Redskins perpetuate negative stereotypes of Native Americans" and praised Adidas for a new initiative to help schools change names and mascots by designing new logos and paying for part of the cost of new uniforms.

Senators Nancy Pelosi and Harry Reid stated in 2013 that the name should be changed. In an interview on May 2, 2014, Senator John McCain stated that he would probably change the name because there are Native Americans who are offended. Former Attorney General Eric Holder gave his personal opinion, as a fan of the team, the name should change, saying that it is offensive. In a television interview Hillary Clinton said that the name should change because it is insensitive.

On May 22, 2014, fifty U.S. senators, forty-eight Democrats and two Independents, sent a letter to NFL Commissioner Goodell asking the league, referencing the Donald Sterling case, "send the same clear message as the NBA did: that racism and bigotry have no place in professional sports." Five Democratic Senators declined to sign the letter, and Republicans were not invited to do so. In his weekly conference call with Iowa reporters June 26, 2014, Senator Tom Harkin said "It has become clear to me over time that the name of the "Washington Redskins" is an affront to Native Americans and it is time to change it." No senators have publicly supported the name, but rather have either declined to give an opinion or stated their opposition to Senate involvement in the issue. In 2016, U.S. Representative John Katko, became one of only three Republicans to advocate a change in a letter sent to Goodell, who responded that a name change is for the team to decide.

In February 2016, British Labour MPs Ruth Smeeth and Ian Austin sent a letter to Goodell requesting that the team's name be changed or, "at the minimum", send another team to replace the Redskins in the scheduled NFL International Series game against the Cincinnati Bengals. Britain has stricter laws against racism in sports, criminalising racist chanting at soccer games, and the game's host, Wembley Stadium, has its own anti-racism charter. The game went ahead, and was played to a 27–27 tie.

In March 2016 Presidential candidate Bernie Sanders stated his opposition to the name.

When the Redskins participated in "Blackout Tuesday" on June 2, 2020, Alexandria Ocasio-Cortez responded on Twitter: "Want to really stand for racial justice? Change your name." Subsequently, Mayor Muriel Bowser interrelated her position that the name is an impediment to the team's return to a stadium in the District of Columbia.

==== DC Metro area jurisdictions ====
The Council of the District of Columbia passed a resolution on November 5, 2013, stating its position that the name should be changed. On May 19, 2015, the five-member County Board of Arlington County, Virginia, adopted a resolution calling on the owners of the Redskins to change a team name that the board said is "objectionable to many Americans, Virginians and Arlingtonians." While a board member supporting the resolution stated that he was descended from the Mayans, two members abstained from voting, stating that they did not agree that the board should take a position on the issue.

Much of the local political discussion has been about building a stadium, beginning in the 1990s when a Maryland location was chosen for what is now FedExField. With the possibility of building a new stadium in the near future, both the previous and current mayors of the District of Columbia have stated that a name change must be part of the discussion, however the team rejects that possibility. When Governor of Virginia in 2014 Terry McAuliffe met with the owner to discuss the building of a new stadium in Virginia. For many years, beginning with the departure of the Baltimore Colts, the Redskins were the only NFL team in a large area from Maryland into the southern states. This is slowly changing as Maryland NFL fans move to the Baltimore Ravens. Many Maryland politicians have stated that the name should change, but Maryland governor Larry Hogan opposes any change, also citing the desire to keep the stadium in Maryland. Virginia fans are now the more numerous and dedicated supporters of the Redskins, and the state and local governments have used economic incentives to encourage the team's relocation of its facilities there, and maintain that the name is entirely a business decision for the team to make.

=== Department of Interior ===
Interior Secretary Sally Jewell, while expressing her personal opinion that she is surprised that the name has not changed given the racial overtones of referring to skin color, also states that tribal leaders do not bring up the issue in discussions with her. However, Jewell, in response to DC Mayor Muriel Bowser's expressed interest in having the team return to the city, stated that the National Park Service, which owns the land, would not likely allow a new stadium to be constructed without a name change.

=== Federal Communications Commission ===
Led by Reed E. Hundt, chairman of the FCC from 1993 to 1997, other former Federal Communications Commission (FCC) officials and experts in communications law sent a letter in 2013 to the current chairman of the FCC asking that the use of "redskin" by broadcast media be regulated in the same manner as other racially charged words. Other racial slurs are generally prohibited entirely based upon FCC rules regarding profanity and obscenity; or the name could have only limited use based upon whether its use is in the public interest. In particular, Hundt argued that Snyder should be declared unfit to own radio stations (he owns Red Zebra Broadcasting, owners of Redskins flagship station WTEM) because the FCC "has been reluctant to give broadcast licenses to people who advocate racially intolerant positions". Jessica Rosenworcel is the only current FCC commissioner so far to publicly state that she has concerns about the name, and recognizes that it is offensive to a number of people. The current head of the FCC, Tom Wheeler, agrees that the name is derogatory and should be changed, but does not plan to use the power of the agency to force the change. George Washington University law professor John Banzhaf challenged the licensing of the radio stations operated by Red Zebra Broadcasting, and those of the TV affiliates of the broadcast networks that air NFL games, on the basis of the term "Redskins" being a racial slur that should not be routinely used, particularly during prime time when children are listening. A report on the high incidence of violence against Native American children by non-natives is being cited as evidence that the use of the word Redskins is not only a racial slur but is "hate speech" which should be regulated by the FCC. The report comes from the Attorney General's Advisory Committee on American Indian and Alaska Native Children Exposed to Violence. Native American petitioners in the cases filed by Banzhaf state that they have experienced or witnessed harm to Native Americans which they believe was caused by "the frequent repetitive use of the word 'R*dskins' on the air." On December 18, 2014, the FCC rejected Banzhaf's petition regarding WWXX-FM on the basis that "Redskins" is not profanity, which is defined as being sexual or excretory in nature.

== Editorial policies regarding use of the name ==
=== Print publications ===
The Associated Press (AP) stylebook review committee is considering whether Redskins is an offensive term that should be removed from its stories. Major news organizations continue to use the Redskins name; however, the following publications limit their use of the team nickname, although most said they would not strike "Redskins" from quotations:

- The Portland Oregonian (April 1992): Following Native American protests at the World Series and Super Bowl, the editor made the decision to stop using all Native American names.
- Kansas City Star (September 24, 2012): The Star's public editor defended his publications' "longtime policy" of avoiding the term "Washington Redskins" by finding "no compelling reason ... to reprint an egregiously offensive term as a casual matter of course."
- Washington City Paper (October 18, 2012): The alt weekly WCP unveiled the results of its readers poll, referring to the capital's NFL team thereafter only as "Washington Pigskins" (or "'Skins") "instead of the name the team prefers, which is a pejorative term for Native Americans."
- The New Republic's editor, Franklin Foer, tweeted that his publication would follow Slate's "air-tight" logic and drop "Redskins" from its stylebook.
- Mother Jones magazine said it would be "tweaking our house style guide" by following Slate, The New Republic, and the Washington City Paper, referring thereafter to "Washington's pro football team."
- The Richmond Free Press announced October 17, 2013 that it will no longer use the Washington NFL team name in news or editorial columns because it is "insulting to Native Americans, racist, and divisive".
- San Francisco Chronicle (October 30, 2013): The Chronicle's managing editor Audrey Cooper told KCBS that the paper would refer to the team as "Washington," adding, "Why should we err on the side of using an offensive term when we don't have to?
- The Syracuse New Times (October 30, 2013)
- Orange County Register (November 7, 2013): Speaking on 'Redskins,' OCR sports editor Todd Harmonson said, "It is the Register's policy to avoid using such slurs, so we will not use this one, except in stories about the controversy surrounding its use."
- The Seattle Times (June 18, 2014)
- The Detroit News (June 25, 2014)
- The Washington Business Journal (August 1, 2014)
- The New York Daily News (September 3, 2014) will stop using both the name and the logo in its reporting.
- The Charlotte Observer (September 7, 2014) will stop using the name unless reporting on the controversy. After a game with the Carolina Panthers, one commentator observed that the Observer avoids the name, using only "Washington" to refer to the team even when discussing the controversy.

These publications, while continuing to print the name, have published editorials advocating a change:

- The Utica Observer-Dispatch (September 17, 2013)
- Las Cruces Sun-News (New Mexico) (October 12, 2013)
- The Denver Post (October 26, 2013)
- Brainerd Dispatch (Minnesota) (October 28, 2013)
- The Chicago Tribune (November 30, 2013) : The owner should acknowledge the trend toward the elimination of Indian mascots and let the fans choose a new name.
- The Frederick News-Post (Maryland) (December 28, 2013)
- The Los Angeles Times (May 25, 2014), and again in May, 2016; responding to The Washington Post poll (see below).

==== The Washington Post ====
The Washington Post (WaPo) is the oldest and largest newspaper in the team's hometown. The Post first published an editorial in opposition to the name in 1992, saying it "is really pretty offensive." An editorial on July 28, 2014, took note of the increasing number of individual and organizations advocating a change: "Every new objection to the use of the word makes it harder for Mr. Snyder to kid himself that he's helping his team or its fans by holding onto a name that, at bottom, is a racial slur with no place in civilized society."

On August 22, 2014, WaPo took the additional step of stating that the name will no longer be used in editorials, although it will continue to appear in other sections of the newspaper: "Unlike our colleagues who cover sports and other news, we on the editorial board have the luxury of writing about the world as we would like it to be." In addition, there are several writers/columnists for The Post (see section below) that have taken a personal stand in opposition to the continued use of the name.

In May 2016, the WaPo released a poll of self-identified Native Americans that produced the same results as the 2004 Annenberg poll, that 90% of the 504 respondents were "not bothered" by the team's name. However, the editorial board continues to maintained its prior position that the name is a slur and that they will avoid its use as much as possible. After the United States Supreme Court decision in 2017, finding that the law barring offensive trademarks was an unconstitutional infringement of free speech, the WaPo editorial board published its opinion that this was not a victory for the team, since the name Redskins remains offensive and does harm to Native American children. In 2019 the editorial board reiterated their advocacy of name change, citing the opposition to such mascots by Native American tribes that has resulted in their retirement by high schools in Idaho and Maine.

=== Online publications ===
- The Capital News Service (October 31, 2013): This news wire service at the Merrill College of Journalism at the University of Maryland said it would thereafter call the team "Washington's NFL franchise."
- DCist (February 11, 2013): The Washington-area news website DCist published an editorial announcing it would refer to the local NFL club as the Washington football team instead of its trademarked name, which DCist agreed is "distasteful, vulgar, and racist."
- The District Sports Page, on the inevitability of the name change: "As long as this issue remains in the public conscience, the Redskins will be compelled to address it. As I said, however, they have yet to find an adequate defense for keeping the name. How much longer can they keep up the charade?"
- The Sideline Observer, a media organization serving university communities founded in Bethesda, Maryland, a suburb of Washington, DC.
- Slate in a story (August 8, 2013) stated, "This is the last Slate article that will refer to the Washington NFL team as the Redskins."
- Sports Grid (September 17, 2013)

=== Broadcast media ===
Robert Lipsyte states that there has been discussion about the use of the name at ESPN, but it is unlikely that it or any other major sports network will stop using Redskins in reporting due to a general consensus that it should report the news (including the controversy) but not take sides, and that taking sides would injure their ability to cover the games. There are also the corporate affiliations that make it unlikely. Steven Gaydos, Vice President & Executive Editor of Variety states his opinion that the broadcast networks should tackle the Redskins name issue. Both the NFL and CBS Sports state that it is entirely up to individual announcers whether they use the name when covering a game.

While not banning Redskins for its broadcasts, National Public Radio (NPR) has advised against the use of the name, stating: "As a responsible broadcaster, NPR has always set a high bar on use of language that may be offensive to our audience. Use of such language on the air has been strictly limited to situations where it is absolutely integral to the meaning and spirit of the story being told." The NPR ombudsman Edward Schumacher-Matos states that the new guideline will likely result in the name rarely being used again on NPR. At the beginning of the 2014 season, several networks report that the number of times "Redskins" was spoken during televised NFL game broadcasts has fallen 42% in 10 weeks compared to the same 10-week period in the previous year, while the use of "Washington" is up 10%. An analysis of the entire 2014 regular season shows a 27% decline in the use of the name in NFL broadcasts compared to the prior year.

== Individual opinions ==
- Dr. John Carlos, addressing the owner's response to protests: "To this day, there has been no real negotiation or real listening and understanding that I know of."
- D. L. Hughley suggests that players should refuse to play until the name is changed.
- Paul Kendrick, author of two books on the history of race relations and lifelong Redskins fan, writes about his realization that the name should change: "Often social progress happens in America when people get beyond an abstract idea and talk with the neighbors and friends who are actually affected. That rarely happens on this issue since too few of us interact with people we recognize as Native Americans on a daily basis."
- Spike Lee, filmmaker, says it is the NFL that should pressure the owner to rebrand the team.
- Ralph Nader, while advocating a name change, states that this should not be a substitute for addressing the deeper problems faced by Native Americans.
- George Cassidy Payne, adjunct professor of philosophy, SUNY. "In America today, one of the most glaring examples of institutional racism and for profit bigotry, remains the mascotization of Native American cultures."
- Ravi K. Perry, chair of the Department of Political Science at Howard University and immediate past president of the Association for Ethnic Studies
- Adam Goren, singer, songwriter, musician, and teacher best known as the artist Atom and His Package, released the song "If You Own The Washington Redskins, You’re A Cock" in 2001 on his fourth album, Redefining Music.
- Stephen Pevar, Senior Staff Attorney, ACLU: "Our society continues to evolve. Many words that were in common usage decades ago have been relegated to the garbage heap because they are recognized today as demeaning and derogatory. [...] The team has a proud history and dedicated fans. Hopefully the team will soon adopt a name that isn't racially derogatory."
- Thomas G. Smith, professor of history at Nichols College, sees a parallel between the current debate and the resistance to racial integration 50 years ago, when the Redskins became the last NFL team to have a black player.
- Jordan Wright, granddaughter of the original owner of the team, George Preston Marshall: "They need to change the name. In this day and age, it's just not right."

=== Advocates in sports for changing the name ===
- Bruce Anderson is a member of the Coquille people who played for the Washington team in 1970. He faults the name and logo as perpetuation stereotypes such as thinking all tribes have a single identity; and by making that identity a commercial brand, something that is not done with regard to any other ethnic group.
- Champ Bailey, a former Redskins cornerback, said that "When you hear a Native American say that 'Redskins' is degrading, it's almost like the N-word for a black person. If they feel that way, then it's not right. They are part of this country. It's degrading to a certain race. Does it make sense to have the name?"
- Joey Browner, who says he is three-fourths indigenous, is a board member of the Minneapolis-based American Indian Movement (AIM) and was involved with the November 2, 2014 rally in Minneapolis opposing the Redskins name and logo.
- Former NFL referee Mike Carey has not officiated a Washington home or away game since 2006 due to the team name. "The league respectfully honored my request not to officiate Washington," Carey said. "It happened sometime after I refereed their playoff game in 2006, I think."
- Former NFL linebacker Harry Carson
- Actor and former Redskins defensive end/linebacker Terry Crews does not think the name of a team is important enough to keep if it offends anyone.
- Larry Dolan, owner of the Cleveland Indians, has criticized the Redskins' team name during a discussion of his own team's controversial Native American logo, Chief Wahoo. According to Dolan, "If we were the Redskins, the day after I owned the team the name would have been changed".
- Former Redskins linebacker London Fletcher stated that after learning some of the history of the term, he became "a little bit uneasy" with the name, but a short time later was seen smiling at Redskins fans at the 2014 NFL draft while announcing the teams draft pick, wearing a Redskins t-shirt.
- Former NFL linebacker Scott Fujita: "Over/under on length of time before Washington football team joins the 21st Century?"
- Former Redskins running back Calvin Hill, who played for Washington from 1976–1977: "Why do we want to use terms that make people feel bad?"
- Mike Holmgren, former team president of the Cleveland Browns, stated in an interview that the name should absolutely change.
- New York Knicks team president Phil Jackson: "The use of the name Redskins is highly offensive."
- Former Redskins offensive tackle/guard Tre' Johnson: "I definitely think the name should be changed ... it's offensive because a group of people that that moniker represents has said so."
- Marv Kellum: "How can you have a [mascot] name like that once you know what it means?"
- Retired punter Chris Kluwe made many comments in opposition to the name, including that he would never play for the team.
- Marv Levy, former NFL coach: "...a crude word, even if not intended to insult."
- Randall McDaniel: "You can highlight the team's history, but to be defiant and say it's not affecting anyone is going through life with blinders on."
- Art Monk and Darrell Green, former Redskins players and Pro Football Hall of Famers, think a name change should be considered.
- Mark Murphy CEO of the Green Bay Packers and a former Redskins player: [nickname is] "derogatory to a lot of people".
- Former Redskins guard Mark Schlereth, who played for Washington from 1989–1994: "It's a pejorative term. And it needs to change. I mean, you would never go into a conference of Native American people and walk up in front of them and refer to them as redskins."
- Richard Sherman, a player for the Seattle Seahawks, spoke out against the Redskins name saying "he wishes the NBA's Donald Sterling controversy would have been a catalyst to reignite the conversation over Washington's controversial team name."
- Former quarterback Sonny Sixkiller (Cherokee): "Redskins name is racist to me."
- Former NFL quarterback Roger Staubach: "If that name is derogatory to the Indian nation, I say get rid of it".
- Jason Taylor, a former defensive end/outside linebacker who played for Washington in 2008: "If you look it up in the dictionary, it's an offensive term. [...] If it offends anyone, the name should be out."
- Amy Trask, former CEO of the Oakland Raiders: "As a society, we should seek to inspire people to be tolerant and respectful of others, regardless of our differences. Using Redskins as the name of an NFL team does not further this goal."
- John Wooten, former player for the Cleveland Browns and Washington Redskins, expressed disappointment that the team refused his offer to mediate a face-to-face meeting with name change activists.

=== Sports writers/commentators ===
The following individuals in the media have taken a position that the name should be changed, some also deciding that they will stop using it in their own reporting. However, one Native American journalist has observed that in the era of social media, not using the name is counter-productive since the team and its supporters will not know about opposing views in online articles or tweets that do not include the name of the team in a form that can be identified by search engines.

- James Arcellana (SB Nation, Bay Area): "Much like pop culture has desensitized Americans to violence, it has also desensitized Americans to the blatant disrespect that still takes place on playing fields today through the use of these mascots."
- Tim Baffoe (CBS Chicago): "For my small part, I feel that refusing to endorse the team name by using it in print will add to the slowly growing movement of writers who understand the absurdity in 2013 of using a racial epithet in sports."
- Jarrett Bell (USA Today): "Redskins have a history of bigotry."
- Matthew Berry (ESPN) on why, after four decades as a fan of the team, he now say Washington rather than the name: "The name doesn't bother me. Hearing it doesn't cause me angst or pain or dredge up any personal history. You know why? Because I'm not Native American."
- Thomas Boswell (The Washington Post) wrote an article based upon his experience when his alma mater, Amherst College, changed its mascot in 2016 from "Lord Jeff" to the "Mammoths"; that although he was as attached to his team's mascot as much as any fan, he understood the reason for the change. Letters were discovered revealing that the school's namesake, Lord Jeffery Amherst, had advocated the use smallpox infected blankets as a weapon against Native Americans not to defeat, but to exterminate them. "Nicknames such as the Lord Jeffs and the Redskins are two illustrations of the same issue. In the beginning, no one means any harm. But once you know better, and don't change, that's when the harm starts."
- Terry Bradshaw (Fox NFL Sunday) in and interview with Larry King, agreed that it is just a name, so if it offends anyone, change it.
- Christine Brennan (USA Today Sports): "It's the right thing to do. If that's not reason enough, try explaining and defending the nickname to a child. It's impossible." In a subsequent column Brennan writes that the NFL Commissioner, Roger Goodell should make the decision that the owner is resisting.
- Michael Brick (author, former sportswriter for the New York Times and third-generation fan of the Washington Redskins), on why he is not going to use the team's nickname anymore: "When people tell you they are offended by a word describing an ethnic group, they do not have to prove it. You have the right to continue using that word. But then you are responsible for understanding the consequences of shifting from unintentionally to intentionally giving offense."
- James Brown (CBS Sports) – Now says "Do the right thing": change the name. With regard to the intent of the owner and fans: "One can be sincere in how they use it, but sincerely wrong in understanding that it is offensive."
- Howard Bryant (ESPN): "Washington owner Daniel Snyder and NFL commissioner Roger Goodell continue to ignore history when they say they are fighting the pressure to change the name "Redskins" because they honor the heritage of the Native people. [...] There is no honor in the story, though."
- Cris Collinsworth: "Redskins' no longer works"
- Bob Costas (NBC Sports): Redskins' name was "undeniably" a slur. He also states that opposition to the name is not "political correctness run amok" given the definitions of redskin in modern dictionaries as offensive, unlike any other word associated with Native Americans such as Chiefs or Warriors.
- Lindsay Czarniak (ESPN), while a fan of the team who grew up in Fairfax County, VA she now says "I prefer not to use the name".
- Frank Deford (NPR) suggests that everyone start calling the Washington team anything they want, as long it is not the Redskins.
- Ty Duffy (USA Today)
- Danny Dundalk (Baltimore Post-Examiner): "It isn't often you have the opportunity to witness factors coming together to rapidly bring about a positive change... The controversy over the name of the Washington Redskins has escalated to the point where we could actually see a name change."
- Tony Dungy, former NFL coach and current NBC analyst: "A couple of weeks ago, someone asked Dungy in the NBC viewing room when the name should change. 'Fifteen years ago,' Dungy said." He also says he will no longer use the name on-air.
- Gregg Easterbrook, senior editor of The New Republic and writer of "Tuesday Morning Quarterback" for ESPN.com.
- Kevin Ewoldt, Managing Editor for HogsHaven.com: "It's the organization we root for and bond with, not a picture or mascot name."
- John Feinstein, sports columnist and commentator: "Daniel Snyder 'knows no shame'."
- Mike Florio (NBC Sports): "[I]ntent doesn't matter; people say unintentionally offensive things all the time...some Native Americans are offended, and the number seems to be increasing."
- Mike Francesa (WFAN)
- Mike Freeman (Bleacher Report), Marylander and lifelong Redskins fan: "I was arrogant in my belief there wasn't a single bigoted bone in my body, while unaware I loved a team that racially insulted a people."
- Christopher L. Gasper (The Boston Globe): "There is a line between tradition and exploitation, between personal offense and institutionalized insensitivity, between capitulating to political correctness and doing what's right. The Washington Redskins and their obstinate owner, Daniel Snyder, are on the wrong side of that line."
- Bob Glauber (Newsday)
- LZ Granderson (ESPN)
- Tim Graham (The Buffalo News): "The R-word should not tumble from our mouths so effortlessly, so thoughtlessly."
- Dan Graziano (ESPN): "The word "Redskin" has a well-established history as a racist epithet, and such words have no business being sung and chanted in support of a professional sports team."
- Greg Gumbel (CBS) has not used the name on-air for three years.
- Robert Harding (The Citizen, Auburn, NY): "Some might call it political correctness. But I call it respect. Let's avoid racist and sexist jokes. Let's not bully or harass the vulnerable. Let's not use hateful language that might not be offensive to most, but hurts some."
- Sally Jenkins (Washington Post): "It's time the grown-ups talk sense into Daniel Snyder" However, in response to the TTAB decision to cancel the team's trademark, Jenkins stated her opposition to government action on the issue, citing concern over freedom of speech implications of the decision.
- Roxanne Jones (ESPN)
- Peter King (Sports Illustrated): "I can do my job without using ['Redskins'], and I will."
- Tony Kornheiser, sports writer and ESPN commentator, wrote in 1992 that the name should change.
- Matt Miller, the lead NFL and NFL Draft analyst for Bleacher Report, stopped using the team name 'Redskins' in his writing – in reference to the Washington Redskins – a year ago, but says people are just now noticing.
- Phil Mushnick (New York Post), makes two points: A name with any racial implications such as Redskins would not be selected for a new team today; and no one would refer to a Native American as a redskin to their face.
- Keith Olbermann (ESPN2), calls the term Redskin "the last racist term you can say at the office without getting fired".
- Bud Poliquin (The Post-Standard, Syracuse, NY): "If it's true that prejudice is the divine right of fools, those who run that professional football team down in the nation's capital should wear jesters' garb."
- Joe Posnanski (NBC Sports) "As a lifelong football fan who loves the history of the game, I still find it almost impossible to believe we still call a team 'Redskins.'"
- Mark Purdy (San Jose Mercury News): "How pathetic that in the year 2013, the National Football League, which is so marketing-slick and public-relations-obsessive, allows Washington's team a continuing pass on this easily corrected issue."
- William C. Rhoden (New York Times), compares Redskins owner Dan Snyder to former Governor George C. Wallace of Alabama, both being on the wrong side of history.
- Lisa Salters (ESPN) will only refer to the team as Washington.
- Brad Sham, announcer for the Dallas Cowboys, tries to avoid using the name.
- Phil Simms (CBS Lead Analyst): Says he is sensitive to the complaints about the name, and his instincts now are to refer to the team only as "Washington".
- John Smallwood (Philadelphia Daily News): "I no longer will consciously used the official name of the NFL team in Washington"
- Rick Snyder (The Washington Examiner): "The time will come for a change to the 'Redskins' name."
- Stephen Sonneveld (Bleacher Report)
- Michael Wilbon (ESPN)
- Mike Wise (The Washington Post), has been a long-time critic of the name.
- Steve Wulf (ESPN)
- Clinton Yates (The Washington Post)
- Dave Zirin (The Nation)

=== Other journalists/columnists ===
- Jeff Bercovici (Forbes): "For Redskins, Name Change Is A Question Of When, Not If"
- Ruben Castaneda (Baltimore Post-Examiner) notes both the team's racist past and the behavior of the current owner; quoting former Redskins running back John Riggins as saying in an interview that "Snyder's a 'bad guy' with a 'dark heart.'"
- Maureen Dowd (The New York Times)
- Gwen Ifill (PBS): "I don't use the name anymore, because I think it's unnecessarily offense, and what's the point?"
- Larry King: "If it offends enough of a group of people, what's the big deal? It's just a name."
- Charles Krauthammer, political columnist, wrote that unlike other examples of "the language police" he dislikes, use of the term redskins has become a pejorative and that the name should be changed.
- Rachel Maddow (MSNBC)
- Dana Milbank (The Washington Post)
- Cortland Milloy (The Washington Post) Milloy restated his opposition after the 2016 Washington Post poll replicating the Annenberg 2004 survey that found 9 out of 10 self-identified Native Americans are "not bothered" by the name.
- Mark Naymik (Northeast Ohio Media Group)
- Tony Norman (Pittsburgh Post-Gazette)
- Soledad O'Brien
- Clarence Page, whose opposition to the name goes back to 1988, (The Chicago Tribune): "It is only a matter of how long public attitudes and generational viewpoints change to where even Snyder's players, fans or fellow NFL owners think it's time to give this R-word a rest."
- Leonard Pitts Jr. (The Miami Herald): "'Redskins' is an offensive word, period."
- Ronnie Polaneczky (Philadelphia Daily News), makes a personal comment regarding the team owner: "In a perfect world, Snyder wouldn't need a high-profile finger-shake from the leader of the free world to hear the pain he has unwittingly caused."
- Bill Plaschke (Los Angeles Times): "'Redskins' is no honor, it's an insult."
- Cokie Roberts (NPR, ABC): "[Similar names] would be absolutely unacceptable. And if people who are Native American are offended by it, we should pay attention to that."
- Eugene Robinson (The Washington Post): "The term ... is a racial slur. Fans of the team, including me, have pretended not to notice this uncomfortable fact for many years. Now we're beginning to confront it."
- Scott Simon (National Public Radio): "I try to avoid saying name of DC's football team on air--as I try to avoid all ethnic slurs."
- Michael Tomasky (The Daily Beast)
- Jim Vance (NBC4) in Washington, DC comments on racism towards any other minority not being tolerated, using the example of Jeremy Lin.
- DeWayne Wickham (USA Today): "Redskins' Snyder no misguided good guy"
- Juan Williams (Fox News): If the team gets a new name its gotta be good.
- Michael Paul Williams (Richmond Times-Dispatch): "If any professional sports team were nicknamed the Darkies, we wouldn't be having a debate over its propriety."
- Eric Zorn (Chicago Tribune)
