= Cleveland Indians name and logo controversy =

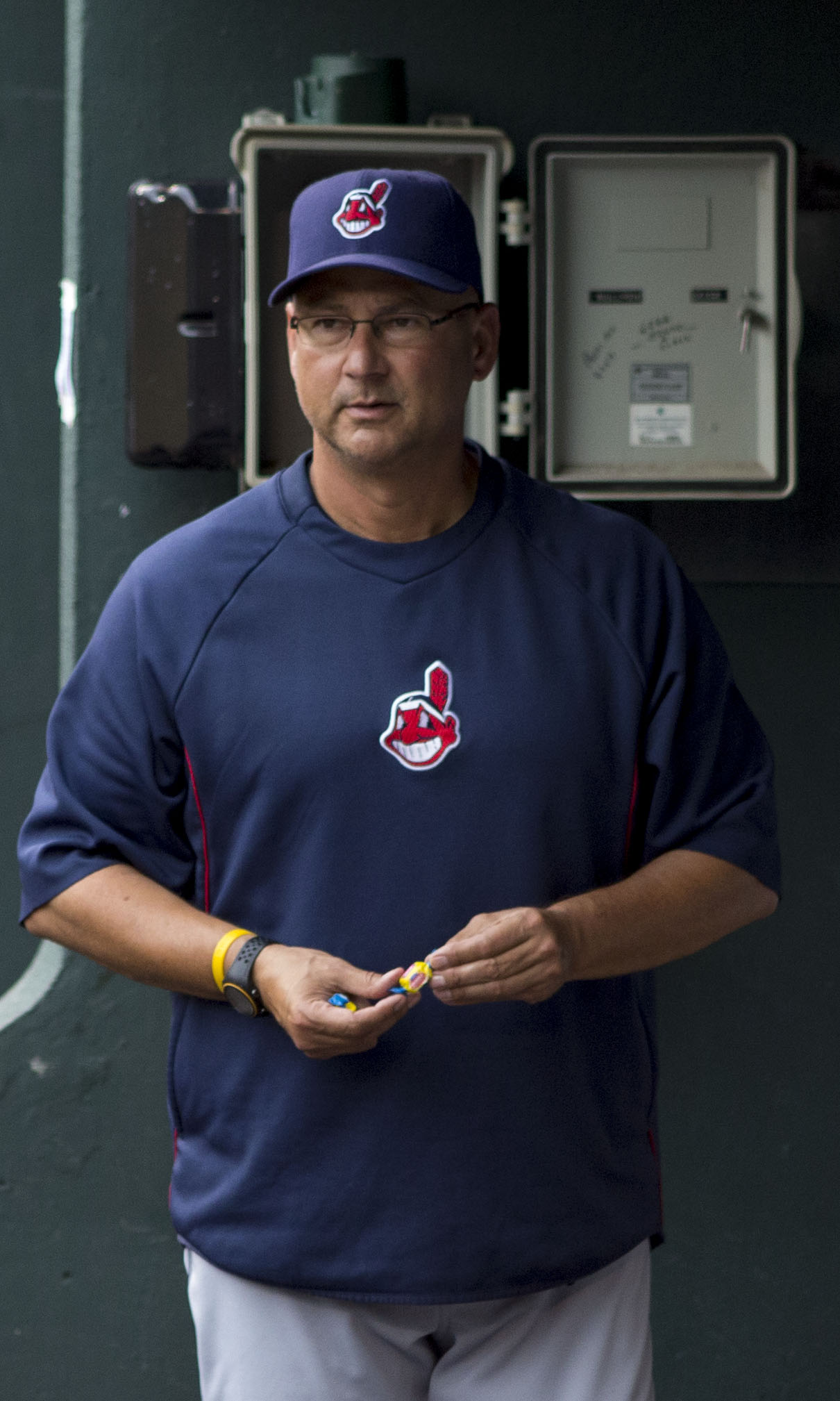
Indians manager Terry Francona sporting the Chief Wahoo logo on his cap and sweatshirt in 2013

The club name and logo previously used by Major League Baseball's Cleveland Guardians were the subject of significant controversy. The Guardians, an American professional baseball team based in Cleveland, Ohio, were known as the Cleveland Indians from 1915 to 2021, and their branding used Native American imagery and caricatures through much of this time period.

Although the controversial logo Chief Wahoo was officially removed in 2018, the Indian-themed name continued to be a part of the Native American mascot controversy which has led over 115 professional organizations representing civil rights, educational, athletic, and scientific experts to publish resolutions or policies that state that any use of Native American names and/or symbols by non-native sports teams is a harmful form of ethnic stereotyping that promote misunderstanding and prejudice which contributes to other problems faced by Native Americans.

Protest of both the logo and name started in the 1970s, but moved quickly toward the retirement of Chief Wahoo when the 2016 World Series drew international attention to the team. Local groups said they would continue to advocate for a change of the team name, and object to the sale of merchandise with the Chief Wahoo image.

Through the decades of protest, team representatives defended both the name and logo as part of their tradition, with no intention to disparage Native Americans.

The Cleveland Indians officially announced on July 3, 2020, that the club would review its name in the wake of nationwide protests against the murder of George Floyd. On December 14, 2020, team owner Paul Dolan announced that the renaming process would begin. The team continued to play as the Indians for the 2021 season while a new name was selected and other activities necessary for rebranding were implemented. During the 2021 season face paint and headdresses were banned from Progressive Field.

On July 23, 2021, the team announced that beginning in the 2022 season, their new name would be the Cleveland Guardians. The name change was made official on November 19, 2021.

== Origin and significance of the name ==
The name "Indians" originated from a request by club owner Charles Somers to baseball writers to choose a new name to replace "Naps" following the departure of their star player Nap Lajoie after the 1914 season.

An oft-repeated legend is that the name "Indians" was chosen because it was one of the nicknames previously applied to the old Cleveland Spiders baseball club during the time when Louis Sockalexis, a Native American, played in Cleveland. The attribution of the new name as being in honor of Sockalexis, a member of the Penobscot Tribe of Maine, is generally discredited given the discriminatory treatment of Native Americans in general, and Sockalexis in particular during that era.

Defenders often claim there is an intention to honor Native Americans and that there are ways to do so while retaining their current representations. Opponents of Native American mascots make no distinction between respectful or disparaging usage, both being based upon stereotypes. The resolution issued by the Society of Indian Psychologists in 1999 states:

Stereotypical and historically inaccurate images of Indians in general interfere with learning about them by creating, supporting and maintaining oversimplified and inaccurate views of indigenous peoples and their cultures. When stereotypical representations are taken as factual information, they contribute to the development of cultural biases and prejudices…

This point of view echoes the position of the National Congress of American Indians, the oldest and largest organization representing enrolled tribal citizens in the United States:

Often citing a long held myth by non-Native people that 'Indian' mascots 'honor Native people,' American sports businesses such as the NFL's Kansas City 'Chiefs', MLB's Cleveland 'Indians' and Atlanta 'Braves', and the NHL's Chicago Blackhawks, continue to profit from harmful stereotypes originated during a time when white superiority and segregation were common place.

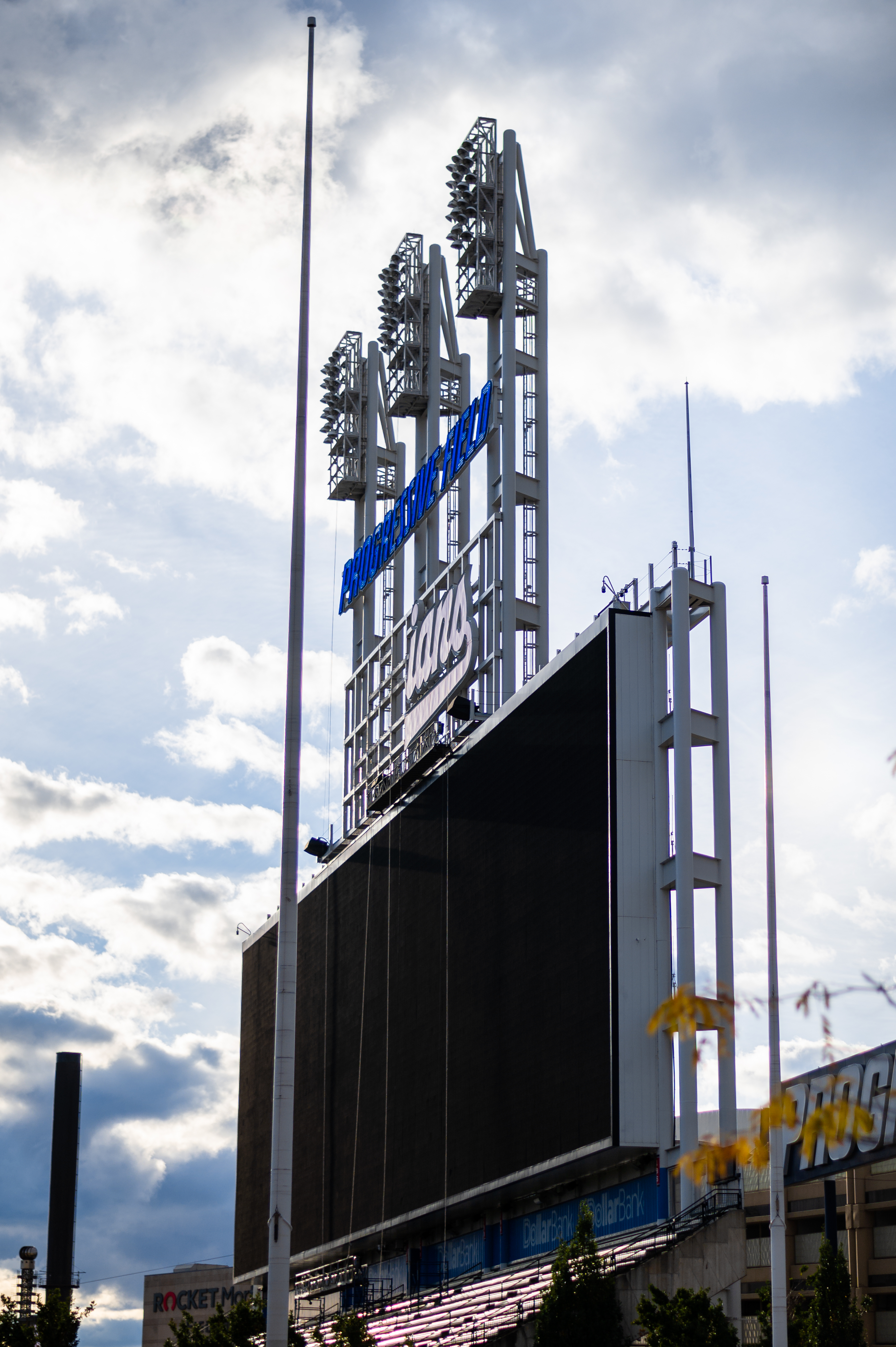
The Indians sign removed from Progressive Field

Native American protesters in Cleveland also state that "retiring" Chief Wahoo would not be a sufficient solution to the issue, since both the name and logo would need to be changed to something that does not reference Native Americans in any way.

== Decline and elimination of Chief Wahoo ==
At the beginning of 2014, the use of Chief Wahoo was officially reduced to secondary status in favor of a block "C",

A small number of fans promoted "de-chiefing" of their team apparel by removing the Chief Wahoo logo as a silent protest while maintaining their support of the team. Team management declined to comment on the phenomenon, but pro-Wahoo fans made angry comments on social media.

Chief Wahoo hats continued to be worn by the players with home white jerseys and alternate navy blue jerseys both at home and on the road. This drew attention in both the United States and Canada during both the 2016 American League Championship Series and the 2016 World Series.

During Cleveland's 2016 playoff series with the Toronto Blue Jays, Renu Mandhane, chief commissioner of the Ontario Human Rights Commission called upon the media outlets in Canada to stop using the name in view of the commission's general policy opposing the use of indigenous names and images in sports. Douglas Cardinal, who is of Blackfoot descent and architect of the National Museum of the American Indian, filed a human rights complaints with Ontario's Superior Court of Justice and human rights tribunal seeking to ban the use of both the name and logo, as well as names and logos of other sports teams deemed offensive, in Ontario.

Protests continued as Cleveland returned to the World Series for the first time in 19 years. In August 2016, a team spokesman said the team was "very cognizant and sensitive to both sides of the conversation" but had "no plans of making a change." Hundreds of Native Americans protested outside the stadium during the first game of the series.

The National Congress of American Indians sent a request to Commissioner of Baseball Rob Manfred that members of the Native American community be included in any discussion; the request was in response to Commissioner Manfred's announcement that he planned to meet with Cleveland Indians owner Paul Dolan about the issue following the conclusion of the 2016 Major League Baseball season. In advance of this meeting, the president of the American Sociological Association (ASA) sent a letter to Commissioner Manfred stating that the ASA and many other scholarly organizations have issued policies based upon scientific research that the use of Native American names and logos reinforces stereotypes and creates a hostile environment for Native Americans. Discussions between the team and MLB continued at the beginning of the 2017 season, with pressure from Manfred that there should be progress towards elimination of the logo. In 2019, the Chief Wahoo logo was removed from uniforms and stadium signs. Merchandise featuring the logo continues to be sold at the Progressive Field team store and limited Cleveland-area retailers to prevent trademark dilution, but is unavailable outside of the area, along with league merchandising partners such as Fanatics online.

== Chief Wahoo as a racial caricature ==
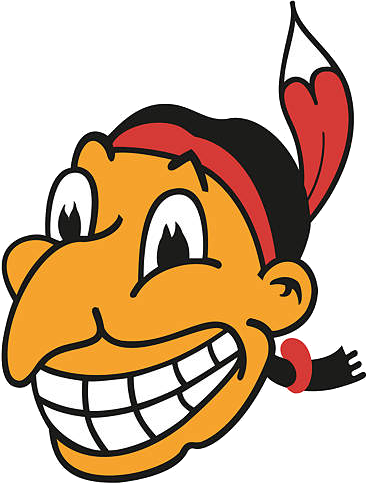
Cleveland Indians logo in 1946

The Chief Wahoo image was the Indians logo beginning in 1947, and is part of an exhibit at the Jim Crow Museum of Racist Memorabilia maintained by Ferris State University in Michigan. For Dr. David Pilgrim, a sociology professor at Ferris State and an expert in racial imagery, the symbol is a "red Sambo" that hardly differs from the caricatures of Blacks popular in the Jim Crow era in which Wahoo was created, when such depictions of minority races were popularly used to inflame prejudice and justify discriminatory laws and behavior. Pilgrim explains how the exaggerated features serve their discriminatory purpose by emphasizing the differences of the depicted race, thereby reinforcing the idea that the caricaturized race is inferior. Bob DiBiasio, the team's then-Vice President of Public Relations, defended the use of Chief Wahoo, saying that fans only associate the Chief Wahoo image with baseball, while framing the team's decision to no longer "animate or humanize the logo" in terms of their "acknowledgement of the sensitivities involved."

The head of the Cleveland American Indian Movement has described the use of the mascot as "exploitative, bigoted, racist, and shameful."

Stanley Miller, while the executive director of the NAACP's Cleveland branch, lamented the lack of response to Chief Wahoo's use. In a 2008 interview, Miller said that if black Americans were depicted in an image akin to Chief Wahoo, "the NAACP would be up in arms about it. The Urban League would be up in arms about it."

Legal scholar Steve Russell, a citizen of the Cherokee Nation stated in 2001: "The Cleveland Indians are probably the least offensively named professional team, until you meet Chief Wahoo. It is like naming a team the 'African-American Freedom Fighters' and then making Sambo the mascot. It is like naming a team 'La Raza' and then resurrecting the Frito Bandito for mascot duty. No one can make the honor claim with a straight face, unless they seriously think Chief Wahoo is a straight face."

A particular problem with Chief Wahoo is that it includes a feather, which has special cultural significance to many Native American tribes. Ellen Baird, a Native American professor of sociology, says that the feather depicted in the logo is traditionally given to a warrior wounded in battle, and alleges that institutional racism prevents people from learning of this.

=== Social science research ===
In a 2008 journal article "Of Warrior Chiefs and Indian Princesses", psychologist Stephanie Fryberg and colleagues studied the effects on American Indian high school students of exposure to Chief Wahoo and other depictions of Native Americans. While reporting positive associations to the images, effects included lower self-esteem, community worth, and fewer achievement-related possibilities for themselves. Follow-up research on American Indian college students again found that exposure to Chief Wahoo resulted in depressed predictions of future achievement. The researchers concluded based upon Social Representation Theory that these results were due to the relative absence of alternative positive images of Native Americans in contemporary society. Instead, mainstream characterizations of American Indians often invoke stereotypes such as alcoholism, higher school dropout and suicide rates; while sports mascots relegate Native Americans to the past, leaving little space for Native students to define a positive identity or think of themselves in terms of everyday social roles.

Subsequent research has found that exposure to the Chief Wahoo image "activated negative, but not positive, American Indian stereotypes", and that the predominantly European-American study participants' "motivation to control prejudice, prejudice level, and experience did not predict negative stereotype activation".

In 2010, the authors of a paper published in the Journal of Applied Social Psychology reported the results of two studies on the effects of American Indian mascots on observers. According to the authors, "both studies show that participants primed with an American Indian sports mascot increased their stereotyping of a different ethnic minority group." The alternative weekly publication Cleveland Scene sardonically interpreted these results to mean that "looking at Chief Wahoo, the mere existence of Chief Wahoo, can change your opinions of a whole separate ethnicity", adding that the study "probably confirms that Clevelanders and Indians fans are inclined to stereotype and hate just about every group in the world." The magazine Pacific Standard also framed the study in terms of the Indians' logo, headlining their story "Chief Wahoo's Revenge: One Stereotype Begets Another".

Richard Lapchick, director of the University of Central Florida's Institute for Diversity and Ethics in Sports, has called the logo "the most blatantly offensive of all the symbols I've seen of Native Americans" during 40 years working in his field.

An article in a 2010 psychology text cited Chief Wahoo as an example of a racial microaggression.

=== Ban of Chief Wahoo in schools and libraries ===
A 2012 report on the use of Native American mascots by the Oregon Superintendent of Public Instruction described Chief Wahoo as an example of a stereotypical Native American image.

In a 2009 guidebook on evaluating American Indian resources for classroom use, the Montana Office of Public Instruction has described Chief Wahoo as an example of a disrespectful image of Native Americans.

The faculty senate at Kent State University passed a resolution in 2004 objecting to the use of Chief Wahoo by members of the school community.

Students at Oberlin College discussed the logo's use in 2001 with team owner Larry Dolan, who formerly served on Oberlin's board of trustees. The head of the American Indian Council at Oberlin presented Dolan with a packet "containing historical, scholarly and position papers about American Indian team mascots".

In 1999, Cuyahoga County Public Library barred its workers from wearing the Chief Wahoo logo to work. The ACLU protested the decision, and the legal director for ACLU Ohio said that the issue was one of free speech, not racism.

The Youth "Indian" Mascot and Logo Task Force is a group in Wisconsin that has asked high schools to retire Native American mascots. In a statement, the group has contrasted the relative acceptance of Chief Wahoo versus that of Little Black Sambo: "How is it that our society can agree to get rid of the image of 'Little Black Sambo', but allow our schools to continue to use caricatures like 'Chief Wahoo' or the sacred symbolism of a chief's headdress? In an age when we are teaching our children to be morally responsible and racially sensitive, we cannot continue to let this form of institutional racism be a matter of choice."

=== Depictions in artwork ===
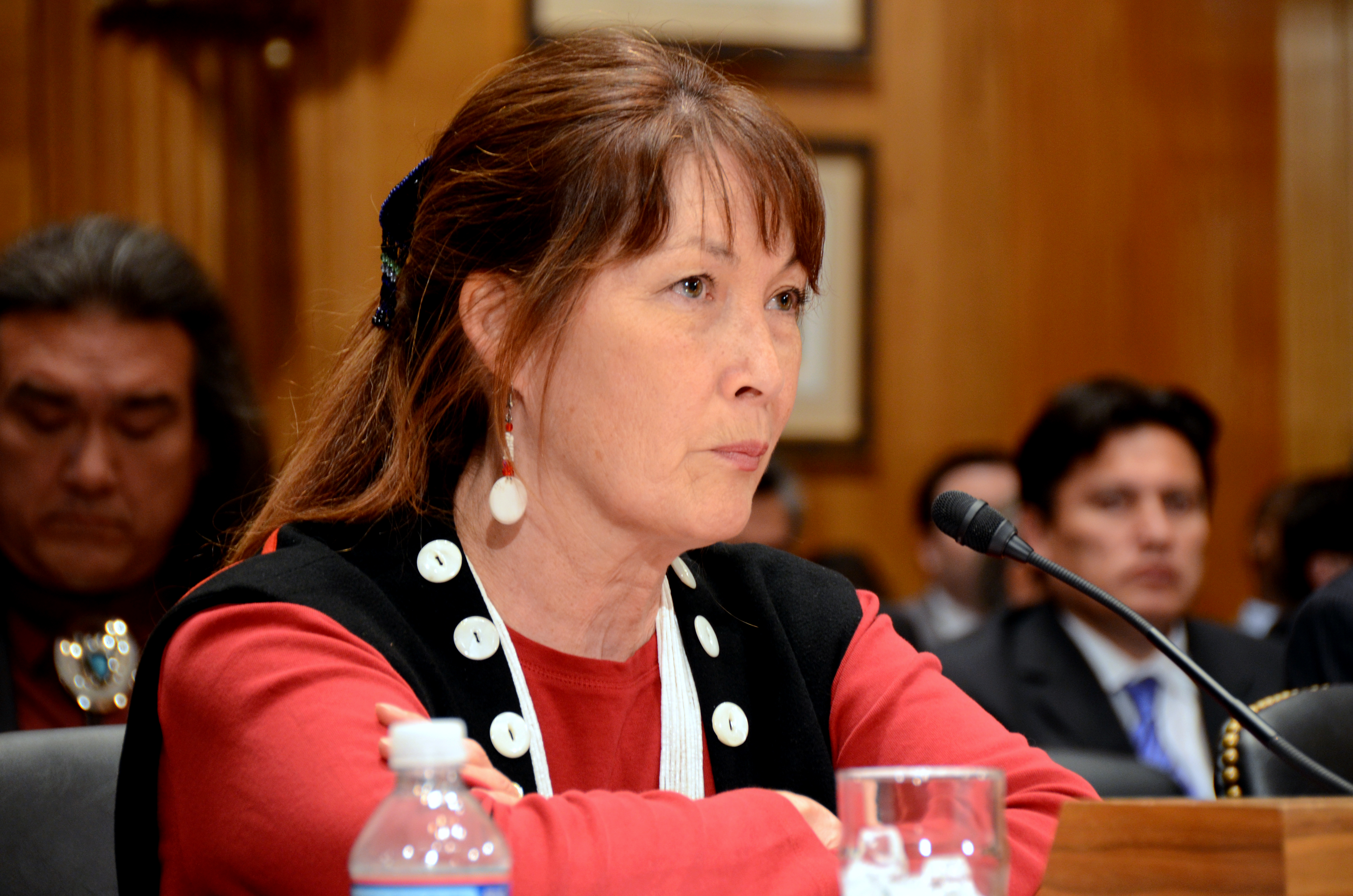
Charlene Teters appears before the Senate Committee on Indian Affairs during a May 5, 2011 hearing. Teters has called Chief Wahoo a "blatant racist caricature" that "honors neither Indian or non-Indian people".

Work by Edgar Heap of Birds that appeared on a billboard near the Cleveland Indians' ballpark

The Chief Wahoo image was featured in a 2012 Ohio Historical Society exhibit called Controversy 2: Pieces We Don't Talk About. The exhibit featured "difficult" objects from Ohio Historical Society collections, including a vintage Chief Wahoo jacket, a Nazi flag, and 19th-century prints that stereotyped African Americans. The following year, the National Museum of the American Indian advertised a daylong seminar on racist stereotypes in American sport with a handout that featured the Chief Wahoo image.

Native American artist Charlene Teters has incorporated Chief Wahoo merchandise into installation pieces. She describes this art as "an extension of the work that I've been doing on the front lines, of the struggle to remove stereotypes and symbols that reinforce the stereotype of the Native people". Teters goes on to say, "What I do is collect these things and put them in a context for people to examine them. I think that we become so desensitized to them that we don't even see them for what they are. And so what I'm doing is putting them in a very concentrated space for people to feel the bombardment. The purpose for me is to create a forum for people to debate the issue." In a work titled What We Know About Indians, large black and white portraits of the artists' family members are "blocked" by brightly colored overlays of mass-media depictions of Native Americans. Teters' childhood portrait is overlaid with a Disney image of Pocahontas, and another portrait is overlaid with an image of Chief Wahoo.

In 1996, the Cleveland Institute of Art opened an exhibit featuring the work of Hachivi Edgar Heap of Birds, a half-Arapaho, half-Cheyenne associate professor of art at the University of Oklahoma. Among the pieces he designed for the exhibition was a 25-by-12-foot (7.6 by 3.7 m) billboard featuring an image based upon Chief Wahoo and the text "Smile for Racism". Amidst controversy, the school initially announced that the piece would not be funded or shown. Heap of Birds announced his intent not to attend the opening, and alleged that the school was afraid of losing donations from Indians owner Richard Jacobs. The Indians' spokesman had no comment on the matter, while the chairman of the institute's board explained that he was offended by the piece and said, "I don't think that's art." Eventually, the school reversed its position after determining that it was contractually obligated to fund the work. Heap of Birds decided to attend the opening, and the piece was eventually shown. He produced at least two different variations on the work, referred to in a journal as American Leagues 1 and American Leagues 2, both of which used the same design. The billboard itself was installed in 1998 near the approach to Jacobs Field.

Heap of Birds later wrote of his artwork:

"Today, Indian people must still struggle in order to survive in America. We must battle against forces that have dealt us among the lowest educational opportunities, lowest income levels, lowest standards of health, lowest housing conditions, lowest political representation and highest mortality rates in America. Even as these grave hardships exist for the living Indian people, a mockery is made of us by reducing our tribal names and images to the level of insulting sports team mascots, brand name automobiles, camping equipment, city and state names, and various other commercial products produced by the dominant culture. This strange and insensitive custom is particularly insulting when one considers the great lack of attention that is given to real Indian concerns. It must be understood that no human being should be identified as subservient to another culture. To be overpowered and manipulated in such a way as to thought to become [sic] a team mascot is totally unthinkable."

=== Penobscot Nation opposition ===
Kenneth Paul, who at the time of a 1993 interview was Louis Sockalexis' oldest surviving relative, described his reaction to being photographed in a Chief Wahoo hat, saying, "They made me look like a fool." On the subject of the logo itself, he said, "Wahoo or Yahoo, it's more insulting than anything. I think they should change the whole thing to something else. It won't break my heart. It won't break anybody's." Paul's son, Kenneth Jr., has said of Chief Wahoo, "I wish they'd get rid of that smiling Indian head."

The Penobscot Indian Nation formally asked the Cleveland Indians to stop using the Chief Wahoo logo in 2000, unanimously passing a resolution calling on the team to retire the logo. The resolution stated that the Penobscot Nation found Chief Wahoo "to be an offensive, degrading, and racist stereotype that firmly places Indian people in the past, separate from our contemporary cultural existence." It also said that the logo "emphasizes a tragic part of our history—focusing on wartime survival while ignoring the strength and beauty of Indian cultures during times of peace." Tribal Governor Barry Dana predicted that "reasoned discussion" would be productive and that the Cleveland franchise would be willing to talk with the Penobscot Nation. However, although Indians vice-president of public relations Bob DiBiasio received a hand-delivered copy, as of 2009 the team had not acknowledged the resolution.

The Maine State Legislature then passed a bill that condemned the logo, making explicit reference to the team's failure to acknowledge the Penobscot resolution. The bill read in part: "WHEREAS, the Cleveland Indians team ignored a petition by the Penobscot Nation in 2000 to cease and desist the use of its caricature mascot "Chief Wahoo," which the Penobscot Nation and many other Americans consider racist and disrespectful to the memory of Louis Sockalexis ... [we] respectfully urge and request that the Cleveland Indians baseball team immediately drop the use of the mascot "Chief Wahoo," which would demonstrate the team understands the disrespect this symbol represents to the Penobscot Nation, the citizens of Maine and the legacy of Louis Sockalexis. Donna Loring, the Penobscot Indian Nation's representative to the Maine State Legislature, has criticized the logo, saying that it "denigrated the contribution that Sockalexis made to the team and to professional sports."

When the Commissioner of Baseball Rob Manfred began discussing a change in 2016–2017, members of the Penobscot Nation again voiced their opposition to the logo as being derogatory, and distorting rather than honoring the legacy of Louis Sockalexis.

== History of protests ==
When local Native Americans were asked to participate in the 175th anniversary of the founding of Cleveland in 1971, they used the occasion to protest the history of native mistreatment by non-natives, from massacres to Chief Wahoo. Protests have continued on Opening Day of the baseball season each year since 1973. The size of the protests grew in the 1990s. In 1991, a group called the Committee of 500 Years of Dignity and Resistance was formed to protest quincentennial Columbus Day celebrations. The next year, the group shifted its efforts, and since then has focused on protesting the Indians' team name and logo. In its early years, the group drew national media attention as it negotiated with team management over whether Chief Wahoo would continue to be used once the Indians moved to their new stadium. When the team moved to its new ballpark, the stadium manager, Gateway Economic Development Corporation, attempted to prohibit demonstrations there, and protesters sued for access. The logo drew renewed scrutiny during the 1995 World Series, when the Cleveland Indians played the Atlanta Braves. The games were marked by protests in both cities. The 1997 All-Star game was also home to protests; these were attended by a descendant of Louis Sockalexis, the Native American player in whose honor the Cleveland team is supposedly named. The Cleveland Indians played again in the World Series that year; before the series began ABC News covered the Chief Wahoo protests and named Native American activist and artist Charlene Teters their person of the week.

Newspapers and other publications have described a tense atmosphere surrounding these protests, some of which resulted in legal actions (see below). Reporters have described antagonistic behavior from game attendees (e.g, shouting "You killed Custer!", or directing war whoops at protesters), and characterized fans as "ambivalent and sometimes belligerent". According to researchers, "it is the protestors whose phenotypic traits correspond with stereotypical representations of Indians that receive the most negative attention ... [the] most vocal fans make darker-skinned protestors the targets of their most disparaging remarks". Physical confrontations have included fans throwing beer on protestors, and participants have described derogatory remarks:

"Each year for the past six or seven years I have joined our native American brothers and sisters and others from the Cleveland area in protesting the use of the racist symbol of Chief Wahoo. Each year we stand outside the stadium, and hear people yell at us to 'go back home.' The irony of telling a native American to go back home is never understood by them it seems."

Protests remain a regular feature, but are smaller than they were in the 1990s. Today, the Committee of 500 Years of Dignity and Resistance has 8 to 12 core members and a total membership of approximately 150 people. Researchers have suggested that Cleveland's low Native American population and its transient status, traveling to and from reservations, have contributed to recruiting difficulties. American Indian Movement chapters elsewhere in the country have sometimes held protests at Cleveland's away games.

=== Arrests and legal appeals ===
When the Cleveland Indians played in the 1997 World Series, protesters demonstrated against the team's use of the Chief Wahoo mascot. When American Indian activist Vernon Bellecourt burned an effigy of Chief Wahoo, police arrested him and ordered others to leave. Later, the police arrested two other protesters who had moved to another part of the stadium. Officials claimed all three had actively resisted arrest. Bellecourt was charged with criminal endangerment and resisting arrest, while the other two were charged with criminal trespass and aggravated disorderly conduct. Charges against the defendants were later dismissed.

During opening day protests in 1998, Cleveland police arrested three protesters for burning an effigy of Chief Wahoo, and shortly thereafter arrested two more protesters for burning an effigy of Little Black Sambo. They were booked and jailed for aggravated arson. However, no formal charges were filed after the booking, and the protesters were released the next day. The protesters, led by Bellecourt, later sued the city for violating their free speech rights.

In 2004, the Ohio Supreme Court ruled in a 5–2 decision that the arrest did not violate the protesters' First Amendment rights. Justice Maureen O'Connor wrote in the majority opinion that "without question, the effigy burnings were constitutionally protected speech," but, citing the 1968 U.S. Supreme Court decision in United States v. O'Brien, O'Connor also wrote that "the windy conditions coupled with the spraying of additional accelerant on the already burning effigies created a hazard" and that "the police were obligated to protect the public, including the protesters themselves."

In 2004, ruling on a lawsuit brought by protesters who wished to demonstrate against Chief Wahoo's use, the Sixth Circuit Court of Appeals decided that the sidewalks near Jacobs Field were a public forum and the owner could not place content-sensitive restrictions on its use. Demonstrators had moved their protests to a nearby public area while the case was pending.

=== Individual Native Americans ===
After the Indians' management chose to retain Chief Wahoo in 1993, Clark Hosick, executive director of the North American Indian Cultural Center in Akron, Ohio, explained his position on the logo. Hosick said he believed that the logo encouraged stereotypical comments, such as sports reports describing how "the Indians scalped" their opponents. He also said that he believed some of these comments would disappear if the team dropped the logo.

Charlene Teters, a Native American artist and activist, was interviewed for a 1997 story on Chief Wahoo and remarked, "We are the only group of people still used as mascots. You wouldn't have someone painted in blackface run on the field." Teters again discussed the logo in a 2009 documentary produced by New Mexico PBS: "This image should have gone by the wayside along with Little Black Sambo and the Frito Bandito. ... That this image honors neither Indian or non-Indian people, and that I think anyone who looks at this can recognize it as a blatant racist caricature, tells you, really, again, our place in the society. ... If it is trivial, as they like to say, then why is there any objection whatsoever to changing these images? I really feel that it has to do more with power than it has to do with money."

In a 2011 statement before the Senate, Morning Star Institute president Suzan Shown Harjo cited Chief Wahoo as an example of the "savage savage" stereotype of Native Americans (as opposed to the "noble savage"), describing the logo as one of several prominent "hideous, inhuman, insulting or just plain dumb-looking" depictions.

Russell Means has criticized Chief Wahoo, saying, "It epitomizes the stereotyped image of the American Indian. It attacks the cultural heritage of the American Indian and destroys Indian pride."

James Fenelon, a researcher and member of the Dakota tribe, has described Chief Wahoo as an "unambiguous racial icon meant to symbolize stereotypical and usually negative images of Native people as "wild" but "friendly" savages."

Writer Jack Shakely described his childhood purchase of Chief Wahoo hat in a Los Angeles Times editorial that criticized the use of Native American mascots:

"I got my first lesson in Indians portrayed as sports team mascots in the early 1950s when my father took me to a Cleveland Indians-New York Yankees game. Dad gave me money to buy a baseball cap, and I was conflicted. I loved the Yankees, primarily because fellow Oklahoman Mickey Mantle had just come up and was being touted as rookie of the year. But being mixed-blood Muscogee/Creek, I felt a (misplaced) loyalty to the Indians. So I bought the Cleveland cap with the famous Chief Wahoo logo on it. When we got back to Oklahoma, my mother took one look at the cap with its leering, big-nosed, buck-toothed redskin caricature just above the brim, jerked it off my head and threw it in the trash. She had been fighting against Indian stereotypes all her life, and I had just worn one home. I was only 10 years old, but the look of betrayal in my Creek mother's eyes is seared in my memory forever."

Native American writer and filmmaker Sherman Alexie has referenced Chief Wahoo when describing the impact of his book The Lone Ranger and Tonto Fistfight in Heaven: "To break Indians out of museums and movies and Chief Wahoo—that's a legacy for any book." In an interview for Time magazine, Alexie compared the logo to Little Black Sambo: "A lot of people think it's a minor issue. Google search Chief Wahoo, put it up on one side of your screen, and then Google search Sambo, and put it on your screen. And this horribly racist, vile depiction of African Americans looks exactly like the Chief Wahoo mascot of the Cleveland Indians. Exactly. And why is one acceptable and the other isn't?" An article in the Santa Cruz Sentinel described Alexie's point of view that white people have the privilege of being appalled at logos like Chief Wahoo, but that being appalled never feels like being humiliated.

Anton Treuer, author of Everything You Wanted to Know About Indians But Were Afraid to Ask, was asked in an interview whether "native people can be more readily imagined than known". Treuer replied that this was the case, and cited sports mascots as an example. He went on to describe the persistence of Chief Wahoo: "We've come a long way since, you know, Little Black Sambo, you know, effigies and things like that kind of dominated the cultural landscape in America, but for some reason Chief Wahoo has persisted."

The issue was framed similarly in The Praeger Handbook on Contemporary Issues in Native America by Bruce Elliott Johansen. Johansen writes:

"The term Indians, on its face, is not overtly defamatory. Sometimes the context, not the name itself, is the problem. In the case of the Cleveland Indians, face value is the clincher — the face, that is, of the stupidly grinning, single-feathered Chief Wahoo."

A writer for The Encyclopedia of Race and Racism makes a similar point, writing that the "use of laudatory nicknames contrasts sharply with the practice of using racial caricatures as mascots—such as Chief Wahoo of the Cleveland Indians".

Indian Country Today Media Network has called the logo "grossly offensive".

=== Legislative and legal challenges ===
There have been multiple failed legal and legislative attempts to end the use of Chief Wahoo. In 1972, Indian activist Russell Means announced a $9 million suit by the Cleveland American Indian Center against the team for libel, slander, and defamation from the use of Chief Wahoo. Writer Don Oakley criticized both the dollar amount and the grounds for the suit in an editorial article, saying,

"$9-million is 'umpteen' dollars in anybody's vocabulary, including that of the original Chief Wahoo, the comic strip character who coined the word. But the suit is real enough, and it reads like something that might have been brought against a defendant at the Nuremberg trials ... Such a heavy burden for such a little guy to carry. The 'racism' behind Chief Wahoo will be news to the millions of people who have followed the baseball Indians over the years, and who no more associated their symbol with real Indians than they believe that Englishmen are short, pot-bellied, run around in knee breeches and wear a Union Jack for a vest."

Russell Means described receiving hate mail for the only time in his career after a TV appearance on the subject, including letters advocating the "ethnic cleansing" of Indians, and the legal process lasted over a decade. In 1982, both sides announced that they were near an agreement; one method of settlement being considered was an annual "Indian Day" at Cleveland Municipal Stadium. A lawyer for the defense said that an out-of-court settlement was preferred, but that he doubted a financial agreement would be part of it. The suit was finally settled in 1983.

In 1993, an Ohio state lawmaker promised to introduce legislation that would have blocked the use of public funds for a new stadium if the Indians did not change their logo. A similar measure had been introduced in 1992, but it failed to pass by six votes. Former Cleveland Mayor Michael R. White once condemned the logo as a racist caricature and proposed a referendum to strip it from all city-owned property, but the suggestion went nowhere. However, Juan Reyna, chairperson of a local activist group, criticized White's reasoning, saying, "There will never be a majority in favor of getting rid of it. There are more people at a single Indians game than all the Indians in the whole tri-state area. It needs to be done because it's the right thing to do."

A 1998 article in the Cleveland State Law Review outlined several possible legal challenges to the use and validity of the Chief Wahoo trademark. Among the possible arguments was the notion that the Indians' actions in Jacobs Field (since renamed "Progressive Field") were a state action according to the symbiotic relationship test established in Burton v. Wilmington Parking Authority. If there was also an implicit discriminatory intent in the design of the logo, then its use would be a violation of the Fourteenth Amendment. The author indicated that this approach would face significant legal hurdles. An alternative and perhaps more successful approach would be to challenge the validity of the trademark, because trademark law bars the registration of disparaging or scandalous marks. A 1999 article in the Harvard Law Review also outlined an equal protection (Fourteenth Amendment) strategy for suits against teams that use native American names and symbols.

Native American activists used one of these strategies—suing to remove trademark protection on disparaging marks—against the Washington Redskins in the 1990s. After early victories for the activists, newspapers including the Ohio State University Lantern and The Akron Beacon Journal suggested that trademark protection for Chief Wahoo might be in jeopardy.

A pair of editorials published in 2009 by The Akron Beacon Journal avoided the issue of trademark protection, but raised questions about how Chief Wahoo might affect Major League Baseball's antitrust exemption. One of the editorials concludes that money, not legal issues, will be the ultimate cause of change: "But private schools and private businesses like the Cleveland Indians and Washington Redskins have a constitutional right to call themselves whatever they want and, if they wish, they may use logos and mascots that offend people. When it no longer makes them any money they will change."

=== Religious groups ===
"It destroys the self-esteem of native American children and it mis-educates other children. It teaches them that indigenous people are sports team mascots, not human beings created in the image of God."

— Bernice Powell Jackson, executive director of the United Church of Christ Commission for Racial Justice

"I would cease being a United Methodist before I would cease wearing my Chief Wahoo clothing."

— Delegate at the 1998 annual meeting of the United Methodist Church's East Ohio Conference

In 1991, the United Church of Christ passed a resolution condemning the use of Chief Wahoo, saying that "the use and misuse of Native American imagery affronts basic human rights and dignity and has a negative impact on human self worth". The Native American head of the group's Indian council criticized the logo, saying, "The image that it depicts looks kind of sub-human. It doesn't look like someone I would consider to be Indian." In an article on the resolution, the team spokesman defended the use of the logo, describing the team's relationship with the local Native American community as "very positive".

Two years later, the Catholic Church's Diocese of Cleveland denounced the use of the logo in a statement by their Commission on Catholic Community Action to Promote Justice. The statement cited a 1988 Vatican document saying that acts "which lead to contempt and to the phenomena of exclusion must be denounced and brought to light without hesitation and strongly rejected in order to promote equitable behavior."

In 1997 the Interfaith Center on Corporate Responsibility, calling the use of Chief Wahoo "insulting and racially insensitive marketing," succeeded in pressuring various companies to stop using the logo. As a result of their efforts, Anheuser-Busch stopped using Chief Wahoo in their Ohio beer ads, and Denny's Restaurants barred its Ohio employees from wearing the logo to work.

The United Methodist Church denounced the use of Chief Wahoo in a vote taken during their quadrennial General Conference that took place in Cleveland in 2000. The measure passed without debate by a vote of 610-293, and was similar to previous resolutions that did not specifically mention Chief Wahoo.

The United Church of Christ reaffirmed their position in 2000, when Bernice Powell Jackson, the executive director of the UCC Commission for Racial Justice and executive minister of one of the UCC's five covenanted ministries, called for the logo to be discontinued.

When stadium management made efforts to exclude protesters, the United Church of Christ joined others in a First Amendment suit. A 2005 editorial appearing in Religion News Services said the UCC had been active against Chief Wahoo since the 1980s, and added that "no other major-league city has a logo with such an offensive stereotype".

The Religious Action Center of Reform Judaism has joined the UCC in their efforts. According to Mark Pelavin, the associate director of the organization, said that the UCC "asked us to sign letters to team owners and to join in some quiet meetings with team officials, and we were glad to do so".

At their 2001 general assembly in Cleveland, the Unitarian Universalist Association of Congregations passed a resolution urging "the Planning Committee and the Board of Trustees to consult and cooperate" with the UCC's struggle against the use of the Chief Wahoo. At a 2012 Unitarian Universalist workshop in Cleveland, participants suggested joining again with the yearly protests against Chief Wahoo.

=== Response to protests by Cleveland management and partners ===
"Whether or not [Chief Wahoo] is offensive is not really a debate. Whether it's racist is really the crux of the issue."

— CEO Paul Dolan, December 19, 2000

Former owner Richard Jacobs vowed not to drop the logo as long as he owned the team. When owner Larry Dolan bought the team in 2000, he said, "I have no problem with Chief Wahoo. I don't think there is any disrespect meant. If I did, I would consider a change."

Asked if the strength of the argument was more important than the size of the protest, team owner Larry Dolan agreed that it was, and said that "you can whip a group of non-thoughtful people to come up and protest anything". Later, in the same interview, Dolan described the protests in greater detail: "It frankly bothers me when I see protestors out there, every opening day. Invariably in the last few days, they want to go to the court to say they ought to be able to protest closer to where the folks are. Now, people who are serious about what they're about don't do it that way. It's difficult for me to give them a whole lot of credence when they just show up, television cameras are there, they do their thing, and they're gone. I'm not encouraging them to come back, you understand, but if we're going to have a possible dialogue, they need to understand where we're coming from."

The Oberlin student newspaper recorded the interview and quoted Dolan as saying, "I firmly reject that Wahoo is racist. I see that it makes some Natives uncomfortable—clearly not all. I think I understand racism when I see it." The paper reported that Dolan claimed his incentive to action was weakened by the fact that Native Americans do not universally find the logo offensive. Larry Dolan's son, Paul Dolan, was at the meeting, and was quoted as saying, "Whether or not [Chief Wahoo] is offensive is not really a debate. Whether it's racist is really the crux of the issue."

Team spokesman Bob DiBiasio has defended the use of Chief Wahoo, saying that while the logo is a caricature, it is "not meant to represent anyone or any group." He has also stated that Chief Wahoo is not meant to be racist, and asked "if there is no intent to demean, how can something demean?" DiBiasio has expanded on these statements elsewhere. In another interview, he said:

"We believe this is an issue of perception. We think people look at the logo and they think about baseball—they think about CC Sabathia, Bob Feller, Larry Doby, and Omar Vizquel. The Wall Street Journal did an editorial about the Jeep Cherokee and concluded that something cannot be demeaned if there is no intent to demean. We still believe the vast majority of our fans like Chief Wahoo."

Statements from other members of Cleveland management have ranged from noncommittal to very supportive. Kurt Schloss, former director of merchandising and now vice president of concessions, has defended the use of the logo as part of the team's identity: "Chief Wahoo is a piece of who we are. ... It's not about representing a person or a group, it's about our history." In 2007, while working as general manager of the team, Mark Shapiro stated, "It's not an area I have control over or choose to focus." In 2013, after becoming president of the Indians, Shapiro was asked by an interviewer about "the official position of the club on the, on the whole, you know, Chief Wahoo thing". He explained:

"I think you always want to be sensitive to anybody that finds it offensive, that, you know ultimately the Indians name and the team, ah, is in recognition of our pride and affiliation with the first Native American baseball player. So I think what we choose to do is celebrate, you know, Louis Sockalexis and his history and tradition with the Indians and, and not to focus on uh anything that we would view, that, you know, anything that we don't view and certainly don't want to put, uh, be offensive to anyone."

DiBiasio has described conversations about Chief Wahoo with the Cleveland American Indian Movement and others as "an exchange of ideas, concepts, philosophies". The Cleveland American Indian Movement also sought comment from Progressive Insurance, owners of the naming rights to the Cleveland stadium. The group's request had gone unanswered for several months as of May 2013, when a Progressive spokesperson claimed to have no knowledge of their letter.

=== Public opinion ===
Surveys from a 2012 dissertation on Native American identity in northeast Ohio identified several different American Indian viewpoints about Chief Wahoo. The majority of participants thought that the logo was harmful. However, there was disagreement among this group over whether the elimination of the logo should be a priority in light of the other issues facing Native Americans. Those who felt most strongly negative about the use of the logo tended to have lived in both cities and reservations. Participants were drawn from two groups, Native People Reclaiming Indian Identities (NatPride) and Relocated Indians of Ohio (RelOH). A 1995 survey asked college students whether the logo should be retained and whether its use was discriminatory. Indian and black students were most likely to believe that the logo was discriminatory and should not be retained.
