= Kyhv Peak =

Mountain in Provo, Utah, United States

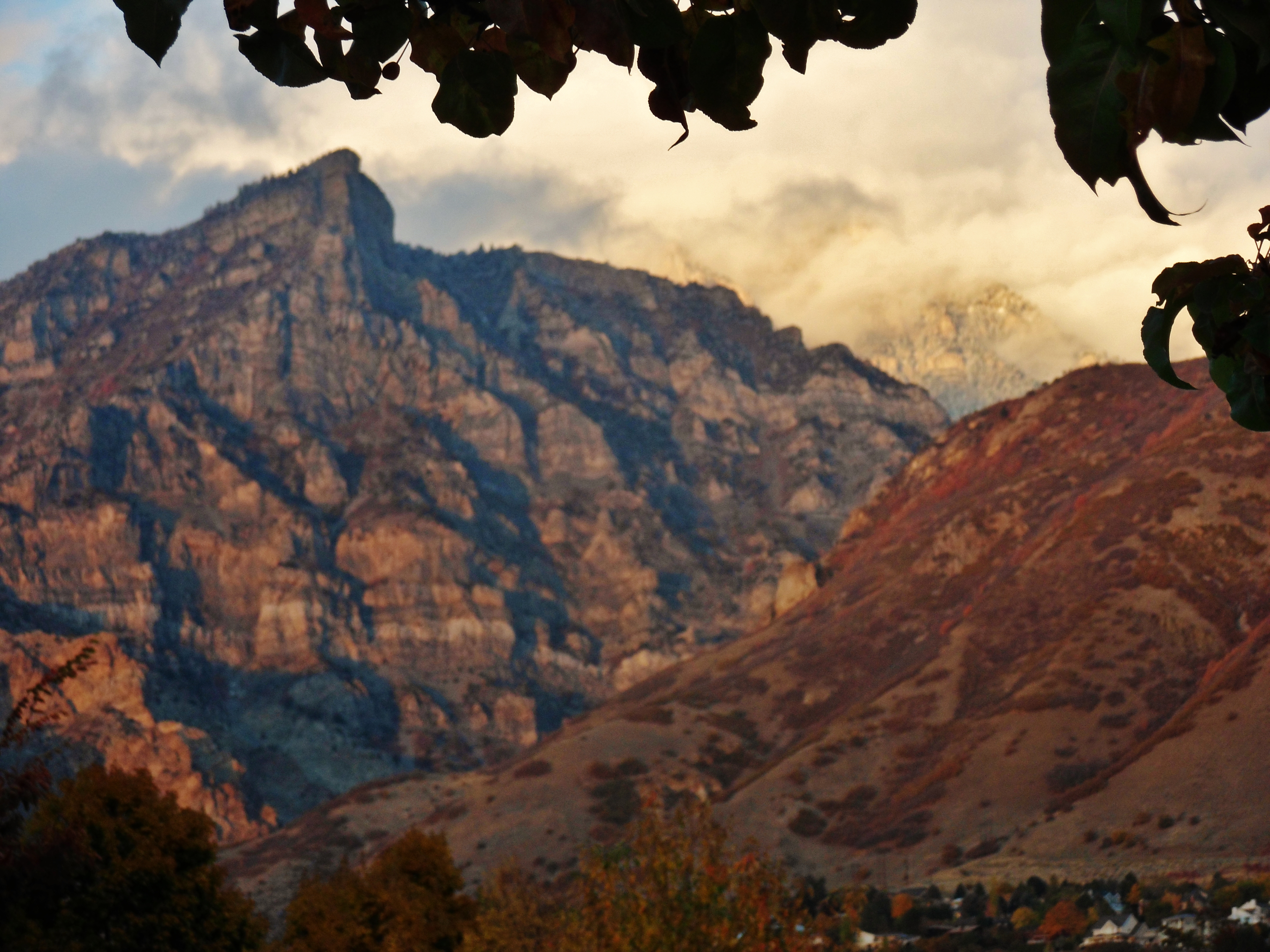
- Kyhv Peak during a fall sunset, October 2012

Highest point
- Elevation: 7,865 ft (2,397 m)
- Coordinates: 40.2717073°N 111.6162701°W

Naming
- Etymology: Variation of a Northern Ute word for "mountain."
- Pronunciation: KIVE

Geography
- Country: United States
- State: Utah
- City: Provo
- Parent range: Wasatch Range

Kyhv Peak (/kaɪv/ KIVE, from a Ute word for "mountain") is a peak in the Wasatch range. It was once known as "Squaw Peak" and was officially renamed in 2022 as part of a federal order to remove the ethnic slur "squaw" from federally owned places in the United States.

== Geography ==
Kyhv Peak is located within the Squaw Benchmark ridge which runs north to south in the Wasatch Mountains of Utah. The peak is specifically located north and east of Provo, Utah at the mouth of Rock Canyon. It is a relatively flat peak that reaches 7,876 feet above sea level at its highest point.

There are two campgrounds and several trail heads available for recreation around the peak, one of which is marked by a stone with "Squaw Peak Trail" carved into it. As the trail heads are located further from paved roads than other trails to comparable peaks in the area, it is not as popular of a hike as others in Rock Canyon.

The peak appears on the Bridal Veil Falls map on record with the U.S. Geologic Survey. Although as of September 8, 2022 the peak is titled "Kyhv Peak" on the U.S. Geologic Survey website, it still appears as "Squaw Mountain" on the map.

== History ==
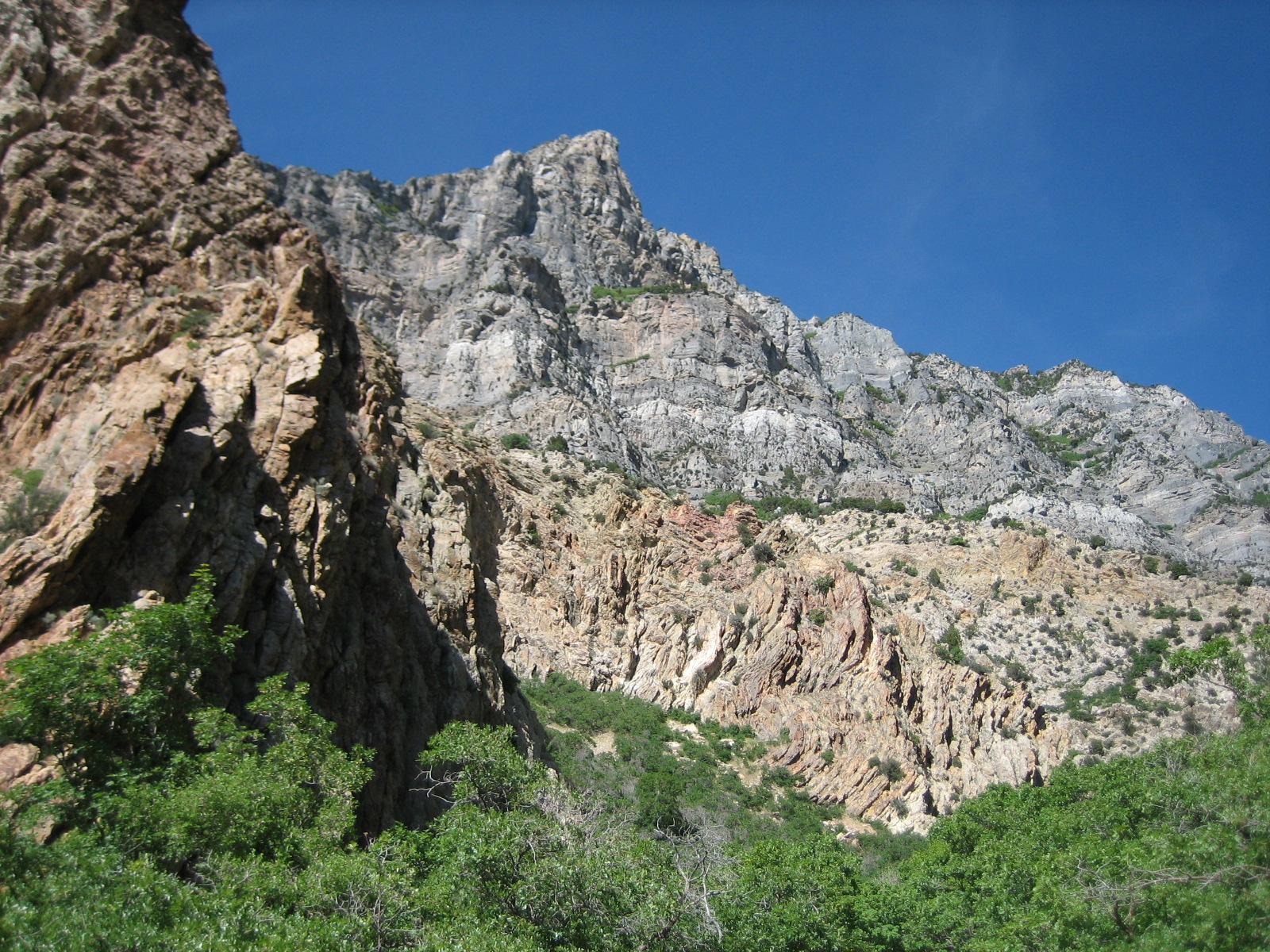
Kyhv Peak as viewed from the mouth of Rock Canyon, showing some of the distinctly visible geological layers

Kyhv Peak, previously known as Squaw Peak, has a history among the white settlers and local indigenous people of the Utah Valley area. While the names of most prominent geological locations in Utah come from the indigenous language of the area, there is no specific indigenous language behind the name “Squaw Peak." The use of the word "squaw" originated with a word used by Northeastern native tribes that was then adopted by settlers moving west. It became synonymous with women involved in prostitution. Other native activists have associated the use of the word with increasing trends of violence against native women. This association caused most of the push toward the name change.

The Northern Ute tribe considered Utah Valley and the area around Utah Lake to be their most permanent home and the tribe continues today to list Utah Valley as its primary homeland. Though the tribe had mostly friendly relations with Spanish and American explorers throughout history, Latter-day Saint settlement in Utah Valley caused tensions. While Latter-day Saint settlers were counseled to have friendly relations with Utes and other local tribes and even to seek conversion, the reality of settlement caused more similarities between Latter-day Saint and Ute relations to other white and settler relations of the time rather than differences. Settlers built a fort in what is now Provo directly on top of Ute hunting trails. Utes retaliated by raiding the fort and stealing cattle and horses. There was a skirmish in the Provo area in 1850 between white settlers and indigenous people that led to the legend of the original naming of the peak. The story involves Ute chief Old Elk and an incident referred to as the "Battle of Provo River." As Ute warriors retreated with their wives and children into Rock Canyon for safety, legend has it that Old Elk's wife fell from the peak and died, and locals began calling the peak "Squaw Peak." This legend has not been verified as historically accurate, but the name was given and used by the locals from that point on.

Further skirmishes between Latter-day Saint settlers and Ute tribe members eventually led to Wakara's War in 1853.

== Repeak Committee and renaming efforts ==
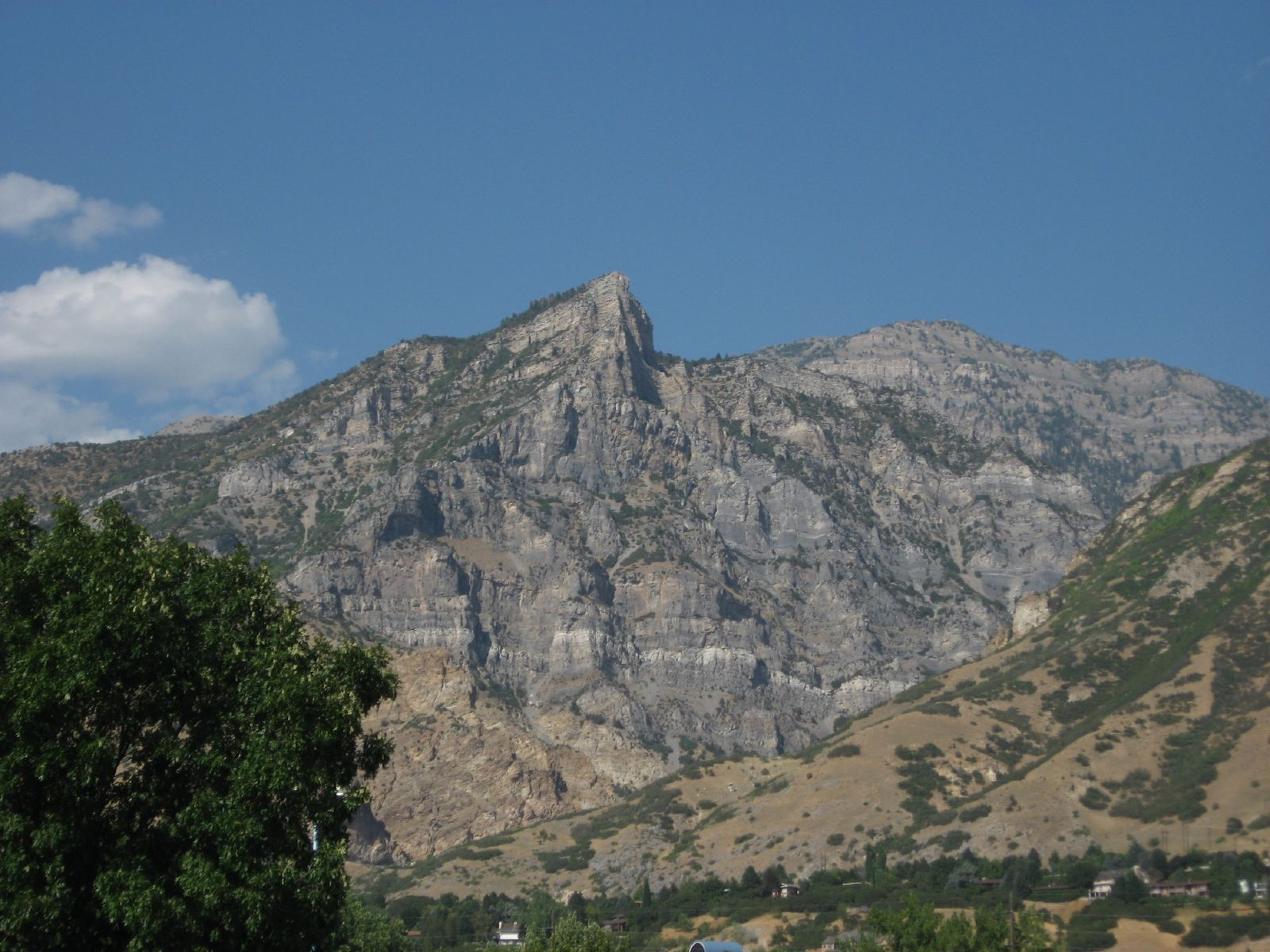
Kyhv Peak, August 2007

Changing the name of "Squaw Peak" was first officially mentioned at a Provo Women's Day Lecture Series in March 2017 by Provo mayor John Curtis. He said he was working with a committee towards changing the name of the peak as the word "squaw" is considered offensive to native tribes. Since the peak is owned by the federal government, Curtis admitted that Provo city's efforts were not guaranteed to result in a name change.

Native activists such as Eugene Tapahe made statements in support of the name change at this time.

In November 2017, a "Repeak Committee" made up of local activists, including indigenous people, came to prominence. The committee's first official act was presenting about the effort to rename "Squaw Peak" at Utah Valley University's Diversity Day Lecture Series. The group and their efforts were also featured in several local newspapers, including Provo's Daily Herald, the Deseret News, The Salt Lake Tribune, and Brigham Young University's Daily Universe.

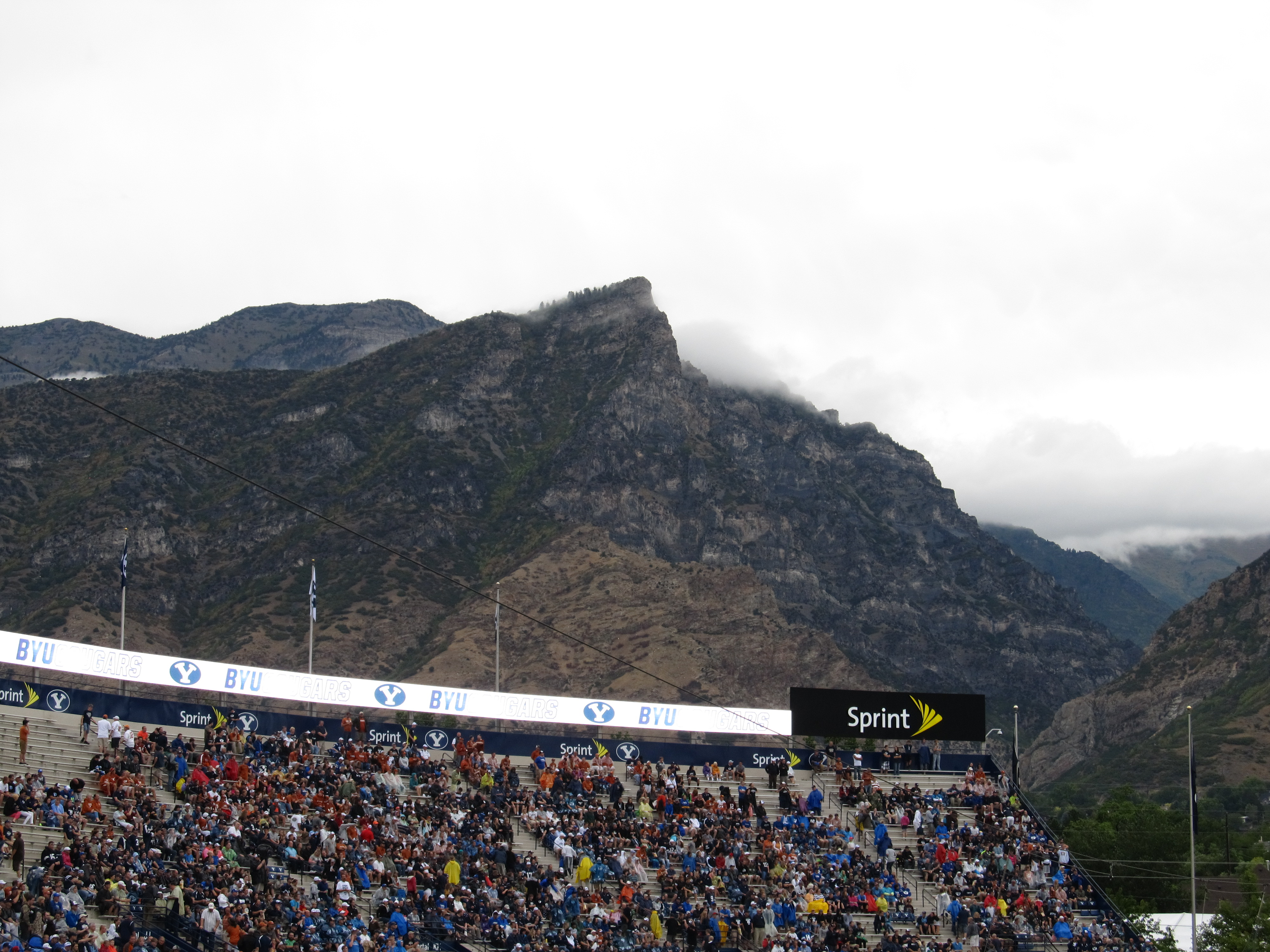
A view of Kyhv Peak from Lavell Edwards Stadium, September 2013

In 2020, a Utah legislative committee met to streamline and localize the process of indigenous tribes applying to have geologic features with names related to indigenous languages renamed. Several members of the Repeak Committee were involved in bringing the bill before the Utah legislature. While the job of renaming geologic features is generally left up to petition approval by the Board of Geographic Names, this process can often take years. the resulting bill involved the Division of Indian Affairs in this process and specifically mentioned the use of the name "squaw" as a reason to change the name of a place. The bill received unanimous approval by the Utah Legislature on October 19, 2020. Several polls during this time period suggested many indigenous people were not offended by a similar exonym, "redskin."

On September 1, 2022, the U.S. Department of the Interior announced that the word "squaw" would be removed from all federal use, pushing forward movements to rename locations all over the United States. The announcement including approving over 600 proposals for name changes, including changing "Squaw Peak to "Kyhv Peak." The name was officially changed on the website of the U.S. Geologic Survey Department on September 9, 2022. This new name has ties to the Northern Ute language, specifically a variation of the Northern Ute word for "mountain."

== See also ==
- List of mountains in Utah
