= Unio =

Unio may refer to:

- Unio (bivalve), a genus of freshwater mussels
- Unio (sternwheeler), a steamboat that operated in Oregon, United States, in 1861, before being renamed Union
- UNI/O, an asynchronous serial bus
- UNIO Satu Mare, a Romanian machine-building company
- Utdanningsgruppenes Hovedorganisasjon or Confederation of Unions for Professionals, a national trade union center in Norway

== See also ==
- Unio Mystica, the union of the individual human soul with the Godhead
- Unio Trium Nationum, a 1438 pact formed by the three Estates of Transylvania
- Convergència i Unió, a political party in Catalonia
- United Indian Nations of Oklahoma, a Native American rights organization
- Unió Democràtica de Catalunya, a political party in Catalonia
- Unió Valenciana, a political party in Valencia
- Unió Mallorquina, a political party on Majorca
