= Rock Canyon (Provo, Utah) =

Canyon in the American state of Utah

Coordinates: 40°16′06″N 111°36′16″W

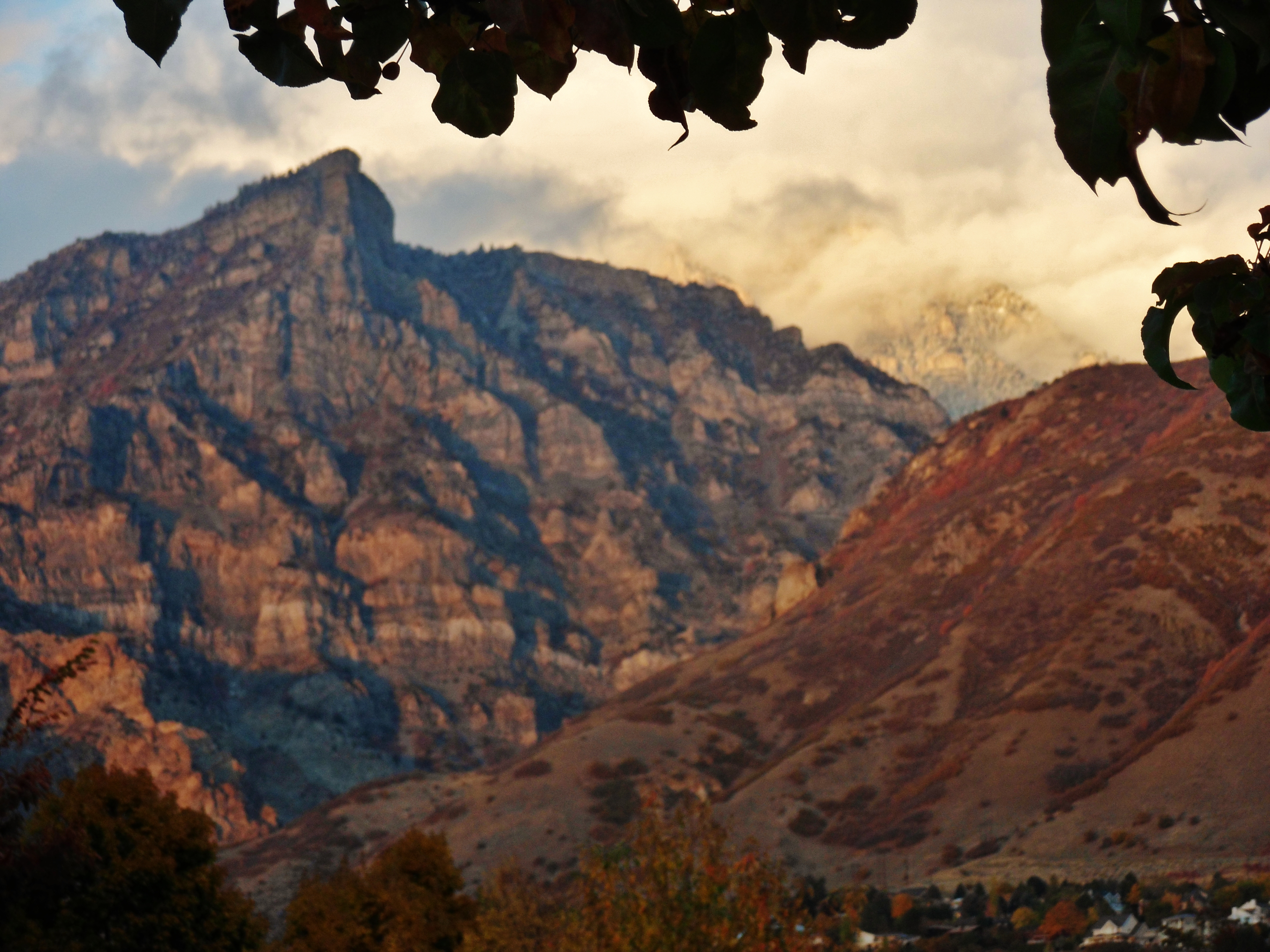
Kyhv Peak over Rock Canyon at sunset

Rock Canyon is located in the Wasatch Mountains, in east Provo, Utah, United States. (Note: Despite extending east into the Uinta National Forest and the Wasatch Range, Rock Canyon is still almost entirely within the city limits of Provo, Utah.) It is popular with rock climbers and hikers (and a number of other outdoor enthusiasts of all types) due to its unique and rugged geology as well as its proximity to Brigham Young University. The mouth of the canyon is located just behind the Provo Utah Temple.

== Notable features in the canyon ==
- Kyhv Peak (formerly Squaw Peak)
- Cascade Mountain
- Lake Bonneville Shoreline
- Wasatch Fault
- Monarch Mine (Buckley Mine)
- Spanish Moss Cave
- Red Baron Cave

== History ==
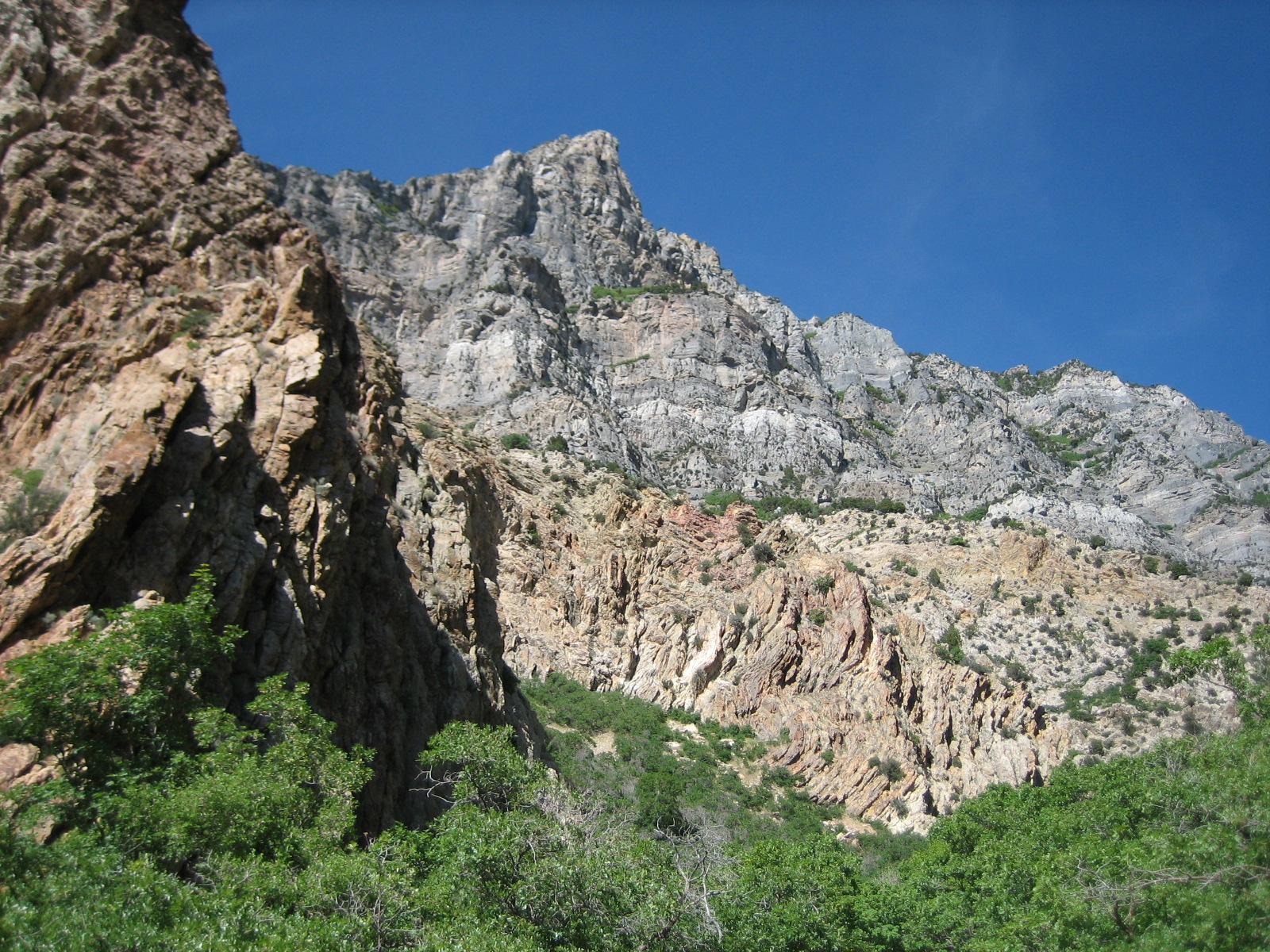
Kyhv Peak as viewed from the mouth of Rock Canyon, showing some of the distinctly visible geological layers

Recorded history of the canyon begins with the conflicts between Mormon settlers based at Fort Utah and the indigenous Timpanogos tribe living in Utah Valley in 1850. A contingent of Timpanogos, under the direction of Big Elk, fled to Rock Canyon following a battle with the Mormon militia. Squaw Peak is the name the settlers gave to the peak north of Rock Canyon, after Big Elk's wife who died in the canyon in the conflict. Some pictographs still exist from early Indian writings. There are large mineral deposits in the canyon and many shafts and tunnels still exist which may be explored. Various rock climbing routes also exist throughout the canyon.

== Wildlife ==
Rock Canyon is home to a number of large game animals and it is common for visitors to observe deer, bighorn sheep, or other species.

== Geology ==
Rock Canyon shows excellent outcrops of dominantly Paleozoic age rocks, with Precambrian Tillite at the mouth of the canyon, and Quaternary colluvium and glacial deposits in the canyon. Rock Canyon preserves a record of multiple phases of the area, including:

- Deposition and lithification of sediment
- North-south bedding parallel shortening
- Folding (top to the east), associated with thrust faulting
- Exposure from Wasatch normal faulting
- Stream erosion of the canyon

Folding in the canyon has made many of the beds perpendicular to the trail. As you walk up the canyon you are walking up the depositional sequence. Rock units seen in outcrop in the canyon from mouth of the canyon (oldest) to back of the canyon (youngest) are as follows:

- Mineral Fork Tillite. Olive colored, fine matrix with larger clasts.
- Tintic Quartzite. Tan to orange in color, highly fractured, with original cross bedding still visible from deposition as a sandstone.
- Ophir Formation.
- Maxfield Limestone.
- Fitchville Dolomite
- Gardison Limestone
- Deseret Limestone
- Humbug Formation.
- Great Blue Limestone Formation.
- Manning Canyon Shale.
- Oquirrh Group (Bridal Veil Falls, Bear Canyon, Shingle Mill, and Wallsburg Ridge Formations)

== See also ==
- List of canyons and gorges in Utah
