= David Narcomey =

David Narcomey is a member of the Seminole Nation of Oklahoma and an activist who was the regional director of the North Florida chapter of the American Indian Movement or AIM.

Narcomey opposes colleges or universities that use American Indian symbols or representations as sports mascots or other sports related imagery.

David Narcomey was perhaps the principal member of the Seminole Nation of Oklahoma who supported the proposed NCAA ban on the use of Seminole Tribe symbolism by Florida State University. Narcomey was, in the FSU matter, considered to be a leading tribe member in consultation with the NCAA while a proposed ban on the use of Seminole imagery by FSU was reviewed.

Later, Narcomey was supported by the Seminole Nation of Oklahoma but a much smaller band of the tribe with promises of financial reward agreed and consequently the NCAA excluded Florida State from the nationwide ban.

Narcomey's stance has been supported by a majority of American Indian tribe members at other universities that use American Indian imagery and research done by Dr. Stephanie Fryberg has found the harm exposure to Native Mascots to be measurable on Native youth. In the same area of activism David Narcomey has publicly stated that any use of American Indian imagery by non-Indians harms American Indian children and this is also supported by the American Psychological Association who in 2005 called for the immediate retirement of all American Indian mascots, symbols, images and personalities by schools, colleges, universities, athletic teams and organizations. His position has been controversial but is supported by the majority of American Indian tribes as exemplified by the campaign begun in 1968 of the National Congress of American Indians, the oldest and largest representative body of Native American tribes to eliminate the use of Native people as mascots in sports.

Narcomey was instrumental in the YMCA abandoning the 76-year-old tradition of Y-Indian Guides, which he believes traumatizes American Indian children.

Narcomey is a retired LCDR, US Navy, Retired RN, practicing Private investigator.
