= Jack Shakely =

American philanthropist

Jack Shakely was the President Emeritus of the California Community Foundation, having served as its president from 1980 to January 2004. According to a 2002 article in the Los Angeles Business Journal, he was earning $240,000 annually as head of the non-profit foundation.

He currently serves as chairman of the Center for Philanthropy and Public Policy at the University of Southern California.

In 2005, Jack Shakely joined the board of the Valley Performing Arts Center spearheaded by Cal State Northridge. He also sits on the board of directors of the Lamp Community, an organization that aims to help mentally ill homeless citizens, and Operation USA, an international relief agency, www.opusa.org

In August 2007, Shakely started a blog that appears to be aimed a getting feedback on his recent book on the American Civil War, specifically in regards to Indian Territory.

Shakely is the former chair of the Los Angeles Native American Indian Commission. A fourth-generation Oklahoman of Creek descent, he is the author of The Confederate War Bonnet,, a historical novel of the Civil War in Indian Territory.
