= Stephanie Fryberg =

American Indian psychologist

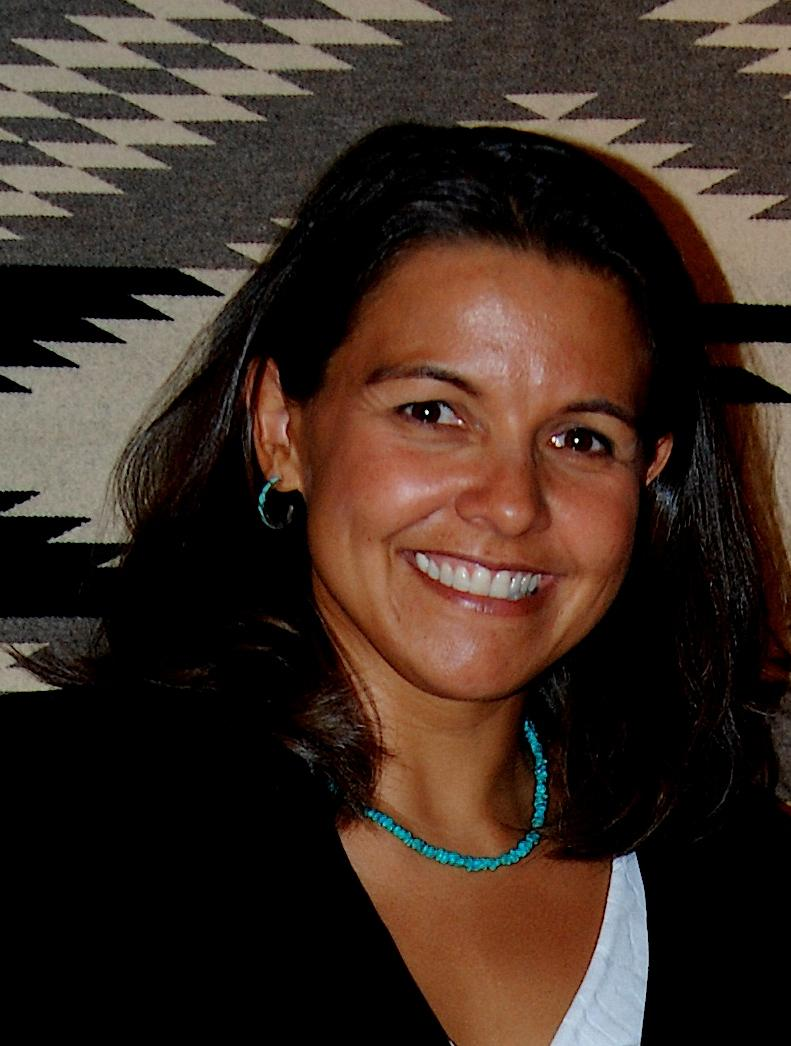
- Fryberg at Native American Student Advocacy Institute
- Occupation: Psychologist

Academic background
- Education: Stanford University
- Thesis: Really? You don't look like an American Indian: Social representations and social group identities (2003)
- Doctoral advisor: Hazel Rose Markus

Stephanie Fryberg is a Tulalip psychologist who received her Master's and Doctorate degrees from Stanford University, where in 2011 she was inducted into the Multicultural Hall of Fame. In the same year, she testified before Senate on Stolen Identities: The impact of racist stereotypes on Indigenous people. She previously taught psychology at the University of Arizona and at the University of Washington. She currently teaches American Indian Studies and Psychology at Northwestern University in Chicago, and is a member of the Tulalip Tribes. Her research focuses on race, class, and culture in relation to ones psychological development and mental health. She translated Carol Dweck's growth mindset; taking a communal-oriented approach. The students on her tribe's reservation who received her translation had significant improvement compared to the original version.

== Studies ==
In 2013, Stephanie Fryberg did a study on survivors of the 2010 Chile earthquake and Hurricane Katrina to find out how survivors deal with the trauma, specifically by attributing the disasters to religious factors. Those who were the most negatively impacted by the disasters were found to be most likely to attribute it to religion or being a punishment from God. Even when levels of education and race were taken into account, the findings held true. Traumatic experiences, such as the survivor having seen dead bodies contributed more to the experience being attributed to religion than one's reaction to the trauma. The study gained insight to those who attribute natural disasters to religion.

That year, another study was published in which Fryberg investigated how academic underperformance among Native American students can be attributed to the standardized model of education more fit for white students that emphasizes assertive and independence, in opposition to the Native American culture of interdependency and intergroup connections. The study investigated one hundred fifteen Naskapi students from Quebec. Prior to the experiment, information was obtained on the assertiveness of the students, extent to which they identify with white and Native culture, and the students grades. The findings showed that the stronger the students connection with their culture, whether it be white or Native, the higher their grades. Low assertiveness when it came to cultural identification lead to lower grades. Having a strengthened identity in terms of culture and racial identification can help Aboriginal students perform better academically. The study showed that an Aboriginal students low academic performance can be attributed to how they are nurtured in school, and it is not inherent.

In 2012, Fryberg investigated the connection between anthropology and cognitive science through the lens of cultural psychology. Cultural psychology assumes that cognitive processes can be influenced by ones sociocultural upbringing. The study finds that this helps people understand humans functioning in different contexts, and that cultural psychology connects one's cognitive functions to their cultural upbringing allowing humans to be understood on a more diverse individualistic level; through class, race, and gender disparities. This study somewhat relates to the previous study due to its considerations on how one's cultural upbringings can impact school performance. It also establishes how one should not approach cultural practices with a bias perspective, as just because a cultural practice is different does not mean it is subordinate. This study emphasizes the importance of cultural context and acknowledgement of diversity in many situations such as education.

In 2008, through a series of four studies Fryberg aimed to investigate the impact of the stereotypes portrayed by Native American mascots on Native American children's self-identity and self-conception. The first study showed that Native American High School students had positive connotations with Pocahontas, Chief Wahoo, Chief Illinweck, and other widely known Native American characters. However, the second study's results found that showing Native American High School students these images decreased their self-esteem. The third study on Native American High school students showed a decrease in Native American student's perceived community worth. The fourth study involved Native American college students, and the images of Native American figures shown to college students decreased the number of ways in which they envisioned themselves achieving in the future. Fryberg's study suggests Native American mascot imagery is harmful to Native American students because it portrays them in limited and simplistic ways, resulting in Native American students also seeing themselves more simplistically. In 2011, Fryberg testified before the United States Senate Committee on Indian Affairs on the effects of stereotypical mascots on Native American students.

In 2019, Fryberg - along with authors Arianne Eason, Laura Brady, Nadia Jessop, and Julisa Lopez at the University of Michigan and The University of California, Berkeley - published a study to the journal Social Psychological and Personality Science aiming to gain insight into Native Americans attitudes towards Native mascots. This study found that for the most part, Native Americans oppose Native mascots, with half of the participants stating that they were offended by the Redskin's name. However, this is moderated by demographic characteristics in addition to Native identification. A year after the study was published, Fryberg was interviewed by the Washingtonian on the results of her study. In the interview, Fryberg mentions the polls by the Washington Post inquiring whether or not polltakers found the title "Redskins" offensive, and how these polls inspired the recent study. She spoke about how the data for the recent study is kept public, and why the data she collected is more reliable than the poll data. In the interview, Fryberg also discussed how the name "Redskins" contributes to the dehumanization of Native people.

In an article in The New York Times on schools that are reconsidering nicknames of their sports teams as an outcome of campaigns against racism, Fryberg counters arguments that teams with Native names honor the heritage of those peoples. "When you use a person’s identity in a sports domain,” she said, “and you allow people to dress in red face and put on headdresses and dance and chant a Hollywood made-up song that mocks Native tradition and culture, there is no way to call that honoring.”

== Recognition and awards ==
Recognition and awards received by Fryberg
Year	Award	Received for	Awarding organization	Refs
2018	Service to the Society for Personality and Social Psychology Award		Society for Personality and Social Psychology	
2014	Otto Klineberg Intercultural and International Relations Award	Stephens, N. M.; Markus, H. R.; Fryberg, S. A. (2012). "Social class disparities in health and education: Reducing inequality by applying a sociocultural self model of behavior". Psychological Review. 119 (4). American Psychological Association: 723–744. doi:10.1037/a0029028. ISSN 1939-1471. PMID 23088339.	SPSSI	
2011	Multicultural Alumni Hall of Fame		Stanford University	
2007	Five Star Faculty Award	Student nominated	University of Arizona	
2007	Louise Kidder Early Career Award		Society for the Psychological Study of Social Issues (SPSSI)	
