= United Indian Nations of Oklahoma =

Native American non-profit organization in Oklahoma

- United Indian Nations of Oklahoma, Kansas and Texas
- Abbreviation: UNIO
- Type: 501(c)(3) organization
- Tax ID no.: 46-2714014
- Headquarters: Stroud, Oklahoma
- Location: United States
- Official language: English
- Website: www.uinoklahoma.com

The United Indian Nations of Oklahoma (UINO), also known as the United Indian Nations of Oklahoma, Kansas and Texas, is an American Indian organization in Oklahoma that is dedicated to advancing tribal sovereignty and the rights of American Indians.

== History ==
UNIO was founded in Oklahoma 1983.

UNIO's "Warrior Up to Vote" initiative seeks to increase voter registration among American Indians.

UNIO opposes federal recognition for the Lumbee Tribe of North Carolina. In October, 2024, cards with the UNIO logo were distributed at the 81st Annual Conference and Marketplace of the National Congress of American Indians (NCAI). The cards critiqued the Lumbee Tribe of North Carolina's for alleged "[s]hifting claims of tribal ancestry", "speculation" without "genealogically verifiable information", and inability to prove descent from a "specific tribe".

== See also ==
- Tribal sovereignty in the United States
