= Washington Redskins name opinion polls =

You wouldn't [take a poll] with any other race. You wouldn't have African Americans vote to decide whether or not any sort of racial epithet would be offensive.

— Louis Gray, member of the Osage Nation and former president of the Tulsa Indian Coalition Against Racism

During the years of increasing awareness of the Washington Redskins name controversy, public opinion polls were part of the discussion about whether Native Americans found the term redskin insulting. Other polls gauged how the general public viewed the controversy.

Two national political polls, the first in 2004 and another in 2016, were particularly influential. When a respondent identified themselves as Native American, these polls asked, "The professional football team in Washington calls itself the Washington Redskins. As a Native American, do you find that name offensive or doesn't it bother you?". In both polls, 90% responded that they were not bothered, 9% that they were offended, and 1% gave no response.

These polls were widely cited by teams, fans, and mainstream media as evidence that there was no need to change the name of the Washington football team or the names and mascots of other teams. By contrast some academics claimed that standard polling methods cannot accurately measure the opinions of a small, yet culturally and socially diverse population such as Native Americans. Native American organizations that represented a significant percentage of tribal citizens and that opposed Native mascots criticized these polls on technical and other grounds, including that their widespread use represented white privilege and the erasure of authentic Native voices. In 2013, the National Congress of American Indians (NCAI) said that the misrepresentation of Native opinion by polling had impeded progress for decades.

On February 2, 2022, more than half a century after the NCAI first passed a resolution condemning the name in 1968, it was announced that the team would be renamed the Washington Commanders.

== National opinion polls ==
=== Sports Illustrated 2002 ===
A survey conducted in 2002 by The Harris Poll for Sports Illustrated (SI) found that 81 percent of Native Americans who live outside traditional Indian reservations and 53 percent of Indians on reservations did not find the names or images used by sports teams to be discriminatory. The authors of the article concluded that "Although most Native American activists and tribal leaders consider Indian team names and mascots offensive, neither Native Americans in general nor a cross section of U.S. sports fans agree". According to the article, "There is a near total disconnect between Indian activists and the Native American population on this issue."

==== Response to 2002 poll ====
Soon afterward, a group of five social scientists who had conducted research on the mascot issue published a journal article arguing against the validity of this survey and its conclusions. They wrote, "The confidence with which the magazine asserts that a 'disconnect' between Native American activists and Native Americans exists on this issue belies the serious errors in logic and accuracy made in the simplistic labeling of Native Americans who oppose mascots as 'activists.'"

=== Annenberg 2004 ===
The survey of Native American opinion most frequently cited by opponents of change was performed in 2004 as part of the National Annenberg Election Survey. Among other questions about election-year issues, respondents who identified themselves as Native American were asked: "The professional football team in Washington calls itself the Washington Redskins. As a Native American, do you find that name offensive or doesn't it bother you?" Ninety percent replied that the name did not bother them, nine percent said it was offensive, and one percent would not answer. The dissemination of this poll by mainstream media helped produce an illusion of widespread agreement among Native Americans that the name was inoffensive.

==== Response to 2004 poll ====
In 2005, 15 Native American scholars, including Vine Deloria Jr., Daniel Heath Justice, Susan A. Miller, and Devon A. Mihesuah, collaborated to critique the use of polling to determine the opinions of Native Americans. They argued that the technical problems that prevented the collection of valid data, in particular the inclusion of many non-Natives in polling samples, were well known. Mainstream organizations that continued to conduct such polls, and those that relied upon them as valid indicators of Native American opinion, reflected white privilege and the erasure of the many authentic Native voices that had directly contradicted poll results.

In 2014 the Glushko-Samuelson Intellectual Property Law Clinic at American University held a panel discussion upon the tenth anniversary of the Annenburg poll, which resulted in a list of 11 reasons to ignore it.

1. After ten years, a poll should not be used for anything other than an indication of opinion at that time.
2. A definitive response to an issue is not likely when there is a single question among many on a long phone survey.
3. No additional questions were asked about level of heritage or tribal membership, although the problems with self-identification were well known. In the 1990 census, 1.8 million self-identified as Native American, when official tribal membership was only 1.14 million. Thus, 40% of claims of Native identity were questionable. This trend has only increased as being part Native American has become more popular.
4. The use of land-lines at a time when half of those living on reservations had no phones, while omitted younger people who had already switched to cellphones.
5. The question "The professional football team in Washington calls itself the Washington Redskins. As a Native American, do you find that name offensive or doesn't it bother you?" is poorly worded and confusing.
6. Other human rights issues have been surveyed repeatedly, showing a progression that a single year poll does not address.
7. Only 768 self-identified individual were polled, which is only 0.04% of the population. This is the minimal sample for statistical significance, ignoring the known issues with validity.
8. Respondents often tell pollsters what they want to hear.
9. If only 9% of Native Americans are offended, is that ok?
10. No follow-up questions about what should be done.
11. Does a survey matter in light of the racist history of the team?

In August 2015, Glushko-Samuelson published the text of a memo written by Chintan Turakhia, Sr. and Courtney Kennedy, both vice-presidents and senior researches at Abt SRBI, the survey organization responsible for collecting the data for the 2004 survey. The memo had been prepared at the request of Ken Winneg, Annenberg's Managing Director of Survey Research. The memo made it clear that the survey should not be taken as an accurate reflection of Native American attitudes at the time, since the methods used to survey the general population are not effective for generating representative samples for all possible subgroups that may be of interest. Some subgroups, including Native Americans, have unique characteristics (e.g., multiple languages, unusual residential patterns) that require specialized survey designs if they are to be measured rigorously.

=== Washington Post 2016 ===
In May 2016, The Washington Post (WaPo) released a poll of self-identified Native Americans that produced the same results as the 2004 Annenberg poll, that 90% of the 504 respondents were "not bothered" by the team's name.

==== Differences between the 2004 and 2016 poll ====
- The Annenberg poll was criticized for only using land lines at a time when they were rare on reservations, so 60% of the respondents in the new poll were contacted on cell phones, based upon other surveys indicating that 95% of Native Americans have at least one cell phone per household. When a land-line was answered, there was a request that the youngest adult present respond to the questions; for cell phones the individual answering the phone completed the survey.
- The 2016 survey included Alaska and Hawaii, which have large populations of indigenous people, while the 2004 survey only included the contiguous 48 states.
- Sample selection: The new survey was part of the routine WaPo opinion survey, in which all were asked "Do you consider yourself white, black or African American, Asian, Native American, Pacific Islander, mixed race or some other race?" Only those that responded that they were 100% Native American/Alaskan Native were then asked the questions about the Redskins. (However, 16% of the sample also identified themselves as Hispanic.) They were also asked if they were enrolled members of a tribe, and if so which one; 44% of the respondents said they were tribal members. In addition, zip codes containing a high proportion of tribal or reservation land were targeted. Due to the low percentage of Native Americans in the general population, responses were collected over a five-month period, December 16, 2015 to April 12, 2016.

New questions included:

- Participants were asked if they had heard about the debate; 56% responded that they had heard "not too much" or "not at all". 78% said the debate was either "not too" or "not at all" important.
- 80% responded that they would not be personally offended if a Non-Native American referred to them as a "Redskin".
- A smaller sample of 340 respondents was asked if the term "redskin" is disrespectful to Native Americans, with 73% responding "No".
- 51% said they are pro football fans, while 48% were not, a split similar to national polls of all adults.

==== Method ====
Due to variations between the characteristics of the sample and the population of Native Americans based upon Census data from 2010, the reported results were based upon statistical weighting of the raw data. The respondents were older (274 of the 504 being over 50), more highly educated (at least some college), and more likely to live in the Northeast and North Central regions, compared to Native Americans in the Census. Criticism of the wording of the question "As a Native American, do you find that name offensive or doesn't it bother you?" as being confusing was addressed by asking the question again to 43 respondents to check that the same answer was given, which it was by 41 of the 43. However, the problem critics have with the question is that it is unclear what is being asked given that "do you find the name offensive" is distinct from "or doesn't it bother you", the later also being awkwardly worded. Reports of the results by the media, such as the Associated Press, say Native Americans are "not offended" rather than "not bothered".

==== Response to 2016 poll ====
Adrienne Keene, Ed.D responded that the poll uses faulty data and methods, such as the continuing problem of self-identification, and the reporting of the results misses the point regarding objections to the name established by social science research and the authentic voices of Native Americans as being about real harms, not individual feelings. NCAI Executive Director Jacqueline Pata stated, "The survey doesn't recognize the psychological impacts these racist names and imagery have on American Indian and Alaska Natives. It is not respectful to who we are as Native people. This poll still doesn't make it right." Ray Halbritter of the Oneida Nation criticized the poll for "never ask[ing] the people if the name should change" and that "no other community's ever been asked to justify their existence or deny their degradation through poll testing - not the African-American community, Latino community or Asian community, no one."

The Native American Journalists Association (NAJA) issued a statement calling the publication of the poll, and the reporting of its significance, as not only inaccurate and misleading but unethical. "The reporters and editors behind this story must have known that it would be used as justification for the continued use of these harmful, racist mascots. They were either willfully malicious or dangerously naïve in the process and reporting used in this story, and neither is acceptable from any journalistic institution."

While not addressing the NAJA criticism, the WaPo editorial board maintained its prior position that the name is a slur and that they will avoid its use as much as possible. However, one WaPo editor and advocate for change, Robert McCartney, decided to drop any further protest in light of the poll results. The editorial board reiterated their advocacy of name change in 2019, citing the opposition of Native American tribes that has resulted in the retirement of Native mascots by high schools.

A Los Angeles Times editorial cites the evidence that the name is offensive to many, which the poll does not change given its questionable representation of Native American opinion.

=== Michigan-Berkeley Study 2020 ===
In 2020, researchers from the University of Michigan and UC Berkeley published a journal article on the results of an empirical study analyzing data from 1,021 Native Americans, twice the size of previous samples. It included Native Americans from all 50 states representing 148 tribes. 69% of participants identified as "Cisgender women; transgender, nonbinary, and genderqueer", with the remaining 31% of the demographics being "Cisgender Men". Addressing the problems with the prior telephone polls, it asked questions regarding offensiveness of team names and fan behavior with more than two options, and details to determine the strength of respondents Native identification.

The researchers found that 49% of self-identified Native Americans found the Washington Redskins name offensive or very offensive, 38% found it not offensive, and 13% were indifferent. In addition, for study participants who were heavily engaged in their native or tribal cultures, 67% said they were offended, for young people 60%, and those with tribal affiliations 52%.

== Polls of the general public ==
=== Opinions regarding name change ===
While varying somewhat, national opinion polls conducted during the peak of the controversy consistently indicated that a majority of the general public did not advocate a name change.

- In an April 2013 poll by AP-GfK, 79 percent responded that the name should not change, 11 percent said it should change, 8 percent had no opinion and 2 percent did not answer.
- A June 2014 poll by Rasmussen Reports found 60 percent agreed that the name should not change, 26 percent that it should change, and 14 percent were undecided. In 2018 journalists for the Associated Press questioned Rasmussen's methodology.
- A poll conducted by Langer Research for ESPN's "Outside the Lines" in September 2014 found 71 percent in favor of keeping the name, and 23 percent thinking the name should be changed. While finding no difference based upon race or gender, this poll found a significant political difference, with 88 percent of people who consider themselves conservative say the team should keep its name, compared to 53 percent for liberals.
- The 2016 annual NFL poll found 64% of NFL fans favored keeping the name while 25% supported changing it. This poll found significant difference of opinion based upon age and race. Older respondents are opposed to a name change, but those between 18 and 29 are strongly (70%) in favor of a change. While 77% of all white fans believe the name should not be changed, only 38% of African-American and 33% of Latino fans agree, which is a change since the NFL 2014 poll in which there was little difference between white and non-white opinion.

=== Opinions regarding offensiveness of the name ===
A September 2014 national poll found that 68 percent think the name is not disrespectful of Native Americans, 19 percent say it shows "some" disrespect, and 9 percent say it is "a lot" disrespectful. This is in contrast to polls of DC, Maryland, and Virginia fans; a small majority of whom said that the word "redskin" is offensive to Native Americans in at least some contexts by 59 percent, 56 percent, and 53 percent.
