= Homeland season 6 =

Season of television series

Homeland
- Season 6
- Home media cover art
- Starring: Claire Danes; Rupert Friend; Elizabeth Marvel; F. Murray Abraham; Mandy Patinkin
- No. of episodes: 12

Release
- Original network: Showtime
- Original release: January 15 – April 9, 2017

Season chronology
- ← Previous; Season 5 Next → Season 7

The sixth season of the American television drama series Homeland premiered on January 15, 2017, and concluded on April 9, 2017, on Showtime, consisting of 12 episodes. The series started as a loosely based variation of the two-season run of the Israeli television series Hatufim (English: Prisoners of War) created by Gideon Raff and was developed for American television by Howard Gordon and Alex Gansa. The sixth season was released on Blu-ray and DVD on February 6, 2018.

Taking place some months after the events of the fifth season, the season, set in New York City, follows the period between the election and inauguration of United States president-elect Elizabeth Keane. Carrie, now working at a nonprofit providing legal aid to local Muslims, works with Saul to uncover a possible conspiracy against Keane while struggling to raise her young daughter Franny and look after a disabled Peter Quinn.

== Plot ==
Set several months after her actions prevent a sarin attack in Berlin, Carrie Mathison is back in the United States, living in Brooklyn, New York with her young pre-school aged daughter. She works for a nonprofit organization providing legal aid to local Muslims. Alive, but now disabled, Peter Quinn lives with the fallout of a major stroke and PTSD. Dar Adal and Saul Berenson continue to work for the CIA, dealing with United States counterterrorism initiatives.

The season is set around the imminent inauguration of the United States' first female president, Senator Elizabeth Keane, and takes place between her election day and inauguration day. The season deals with a suspected cover-up of a terror plot, and the Joint Comprehensive Plan of Action.

== Cast and characters ==
=== Main ===
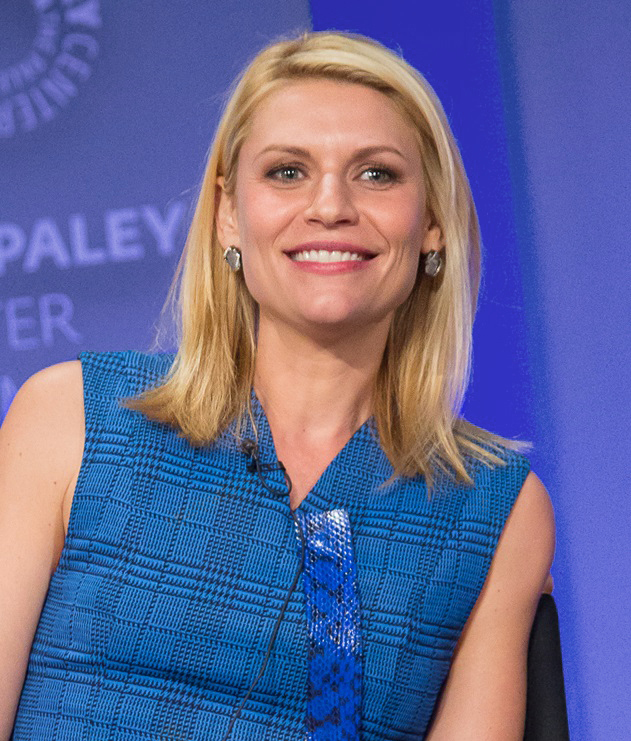
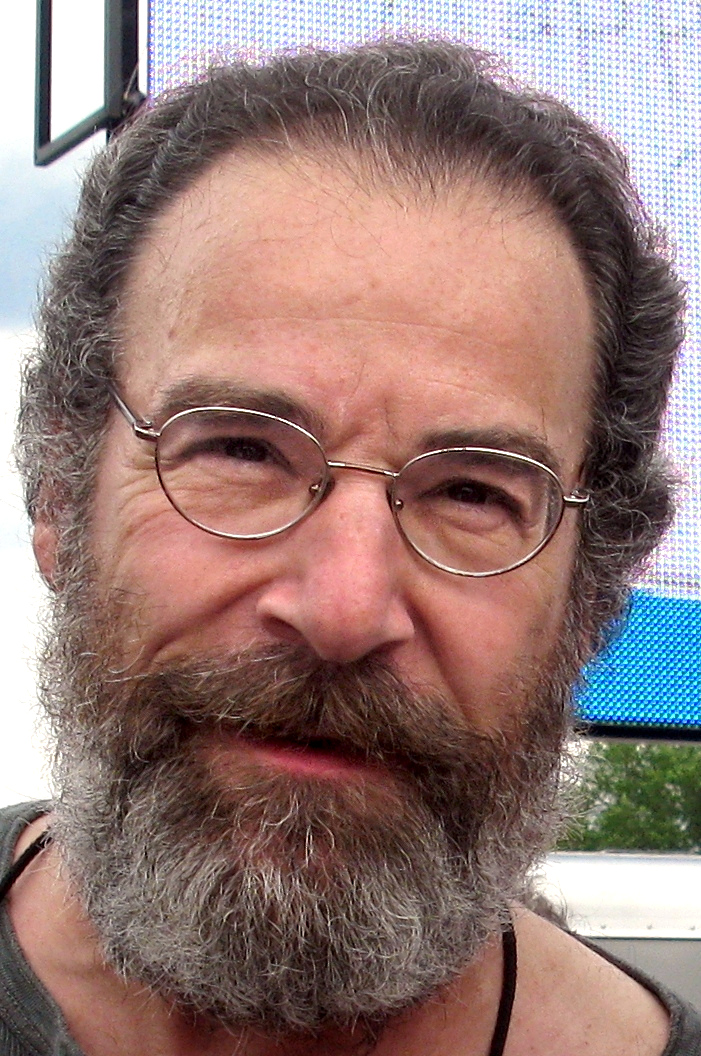
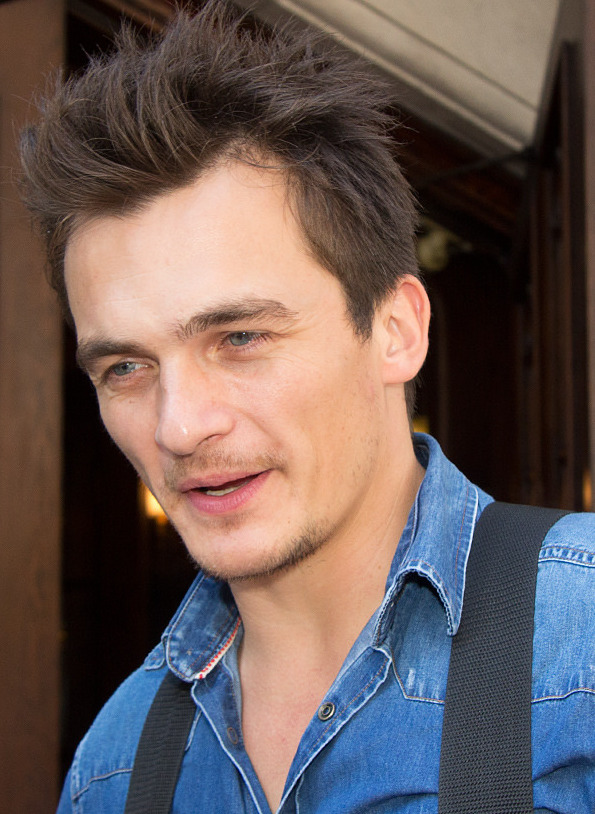
Claire Danes, Mandy Patinkin and Rupert Friend (left to right) portray lead roles Carrie Mathison, Saul Berenson and Peter Quinn, respectively.
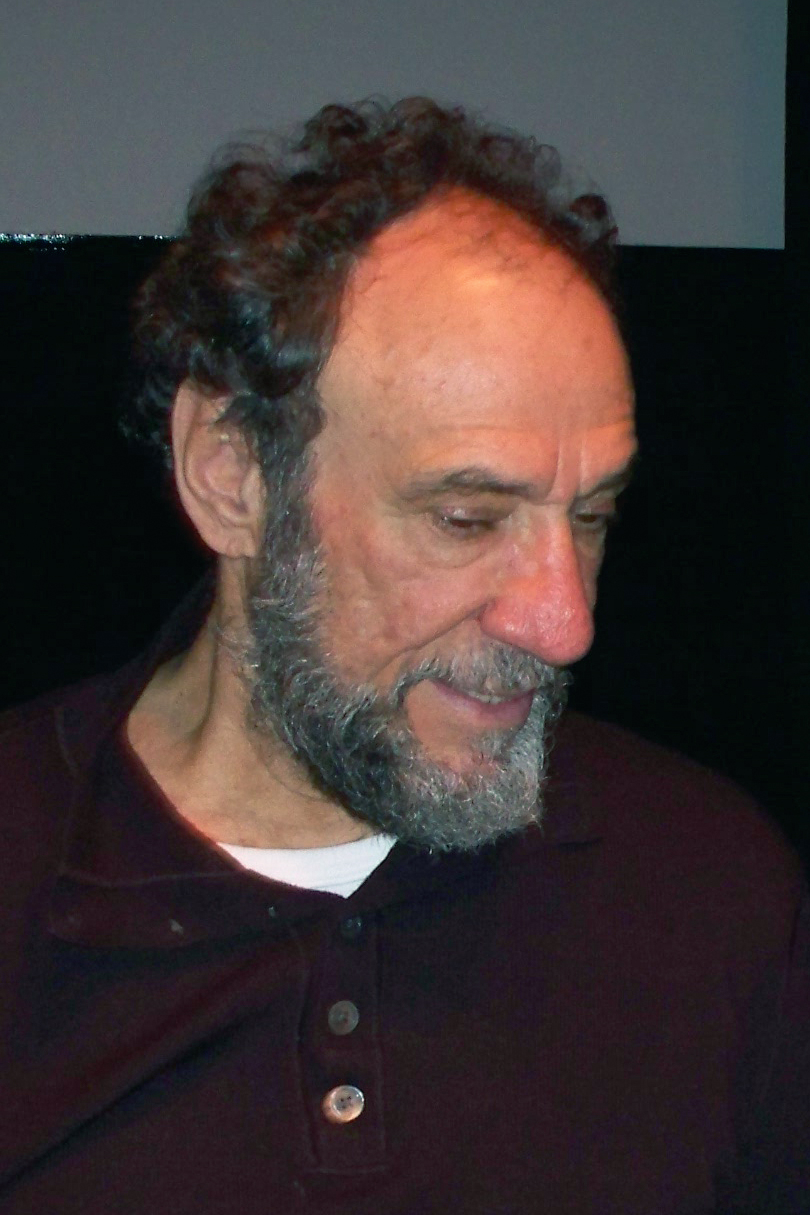
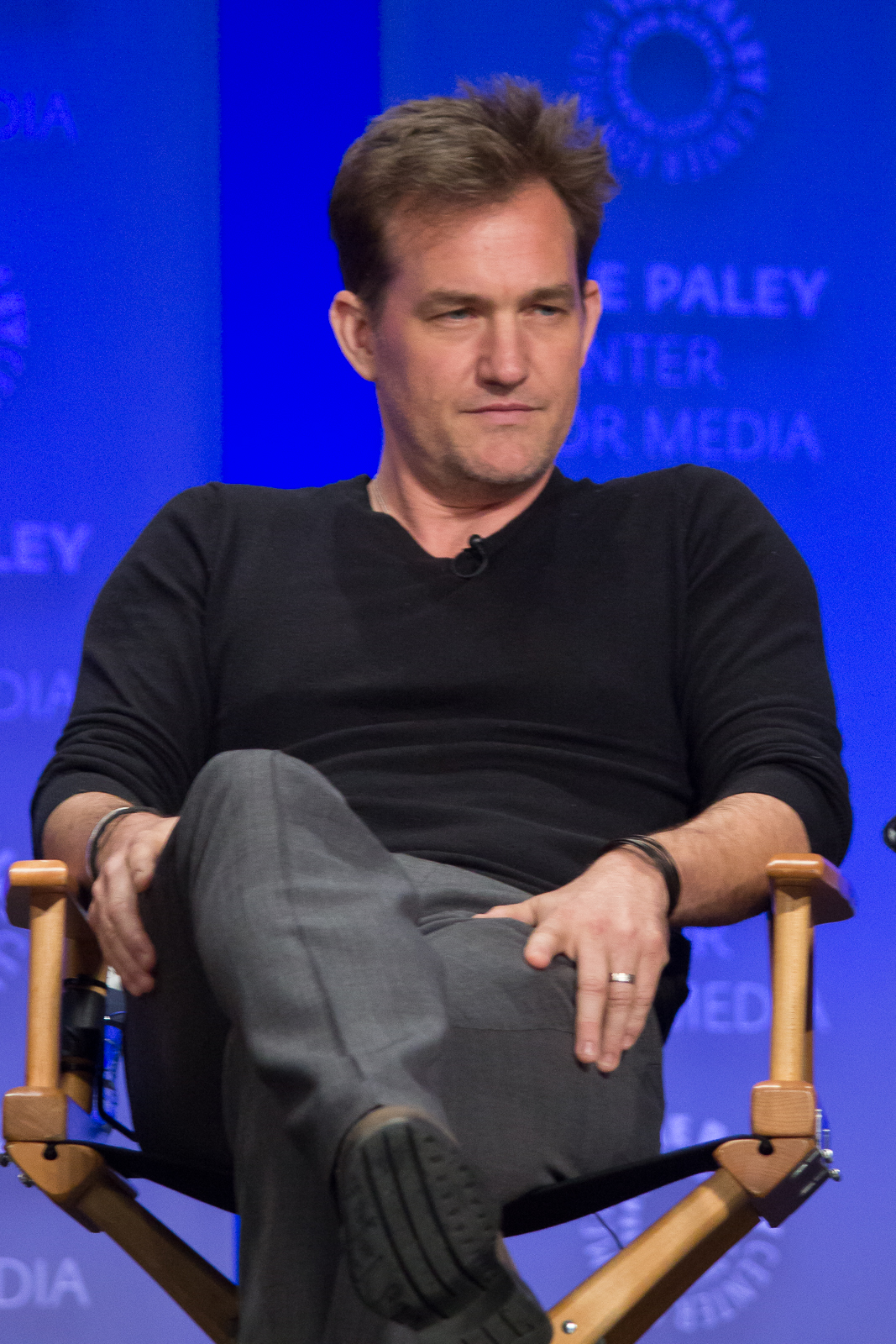
F. Murray Abraham and Maury Sterling (left to right) portray Dar Adal and Max, respectively.
- Claire Danes as Carrie Mathison, now working at the Fair Trial Project, a civil rights organization that represents Muslims mistreated by domestic law enforcement in New York
- Rupert Friend as Peter Quinn, a former CIA SAD/SOG (black ops) operative recovering from a stroke caused by sarin poisoning
- Elizabeth Marvel as Elizabeth Keane, President-elect of the United States and former junior senator from New York
- F. Murray Abraham as Dar Adal, a senior CIA official and black ops specialist, concerned about President-elect Keane's antiwar agenda
- Mandy Patinkin as Saul Berenson, a senior CIA official and Carrie's former boss and mentor

=== Recurring ===
- Hill Harper as Rob Emmons, the White House Chief of Staff designated to President-elect Keane
- Robert Knepper as General Jamie McClendon, the Department of Defense representative briefing President-elect Keane and her transition team
- Dominic Fumusa as FBI Special Agent Ray Conlin
- Patrick Sabongui as Reda Hashem, CUNY School of Law professor and head lawyer at the Fair Trial Project who Carrie works with
- J. Mallory McCree as Sekou Bah, a young Muslim man suspected of radicalization and a client of Carrie's
- Zainab Jah as Aby Bah, Sekou's mother
- Ashlei Sharpe Chestnut as Simone Bah, Sekou's sister
- Leo Manzari as Saad Mahsud, Sekou's friend who is secretly an FBI informant
- Mickey O'Hagan as Clarice, a prostitute and Quinn's friend
- Claire and McKenna Keane as Frances "Franny" Mathison, Carrie's daughter
- Maury Sterling as Max Piotrowski, a freelance surveillance expert and Carrie's trusted ally
- C.J. Wilson as Porteous Belli, a mercenary
- Bernard White as Farhad Nafisi, a mysterious financier associated with Iran and the IRGC
- James Mount as Secret Service Agent Thoms, President-elect Keane's head of security
- Shaun Toub as Majid Javadi, an IRGC general and CIA asset
- Jake Weber as Brett O’Keefe, a fiery right-wing TV host and provocateur who runs a disinformation campaign against the President-elect
- Seth Numrich as Nate Joseph, a CIA analyst and technician
- Nina Hoss as Astrid, a German Intelligence officer working for the BND and Quinn's former on-and-off lover
- Marin Hinkle as Christine Lonas, a youth care social worker
- David Thornton as George Pallis, Solicitor General of the United States

=== Guest ===
- Hadar Ratzon-Rotem as Tova Rivlin, a Mossad agent
- Alfredo Narciso as Senator Elian Coto, a member of Dar Adal's secret cabal
- Bobby Moreno as Tommy, Clarice's boyfriend and a drug dealer
- Sebastian Koch as Otto Düring, a German philanthropist and Carrie's former boss
- Jacqueline Antaramian as Dorit, Saul's sister who lives in the West Bank
- Ian Kahn as Roger, an NSA official who worked with Carrie in Baghdad
- Allan Corduner as Etai Luskin, a Mossad agent and Saul's longtime friend
- Deborah Hedwall as Marjorie Diehl, a housekeeper at President-elect Keane's safehouse who bonds with her despite their political differences over their sons' deaths
- Robert Bogue as E.S.U. Captain Wilson
- Rachel Ticotin as Mercedes Acosta, New York CIA Station Chief
- Alan Dale as President Morse, the incumbent President of the United States
- Ronald Guttman as Viktor, a Russian diplomat
- Anthony Azizi as Naser, an IRGC official
- Martha Raddatz as herself
- Orlagh Cassidy as Rachel Crofts, a CIA official in New York
- Chris Coy as Rudy, a producer on O'Keefe's show
- Lesli Margherita as Sharon Aldright a producer on O'Keefe's show and his girlfriend
- David Adkins as Dr. Schouten
- Bradford Anderson as Trent
- Sarita Choudhury as Mira Berenson, Saul's ex-wife
- Erin Darke as Nicki, a waitress at a diner that Quinn used to visit
- Dov Tiefenbach as The Jeweler
- Julee Cerda as Reiko Umon
- Linus Roache as David Wellington, President Keane's new White House Chief of Staff
- John Getz as Joe Crocker, United States Secretary of State to President Morse
- Philip Casnoff as Christopher

== Episodes ==
No. overall	No. in season	Title	Directed by	Written by	Original release date	Prod. code	U.S. viewers (millions)
61	1	"Fair Game"	Keith Gordon	Alex Gansa & Ted Mann	January 15, 2017 (Note: "Fair Game" was released online and on demand by Showtime on December 30, 2016, ahead of its broadcast on television.)	6WAH01	1.08
Three months after the events of season 5, Carrie is living in New York City, helping run a nonprofit defending the civil liberties of American Muslims. Her latest client is Sekou Bah, a young Muslim man arrested by the FBI for possible terrorist ties after posting a series of online videos sympathizing with Al-Qaeda. Carrie additionally looks after Quinn, who is recovering from his stroke at a veterans' hospital. After Quinn leaves the hospital to indulge in drugs with prostitutes and gets his gun and veterans' check stolen from him, Carrie provides him shelter in her home. Saul and Dar Adal advise President-elect Elizabeth Keane on the state of the CIA. Dar, concerned that Keane may demilitarize the CIA due to her son's death while serving in Iraq, covertly plots with his cabal of senior government officials to undermine Keane.
62	2	"The Man in the Basement"	Keith Gordon	Chip Johannessen	January 22, 2017	6WAH02	1.45
The FBI find $5,000 under Sekou's mattress, which Sekou claims was loaned to him by his friend Saad for a family trip to Nigeria. Carrie and Max learn that Saad is an FBI informant; Carrie defies a court order and confronts Saad herself, learning he was instructed by the FBI to give Sekou the money despite his belief in Sekou's innocence. Dar reports to President-elect Keane's chief of staff that Iran may be working with North Korea to develop a clandestine nuclear program, and that Israel wants the Americans' help to apprehend Iran's liaison with the North Koreans in Abu Dhabi. Carrie, who is secretly advising Keane, suggests that Saul be the one to represent the U.S. during the mission. Quinn suffers a seizure while shopping; he has Carrie show him the video footage of his exposure to sarin gas, telling her he has no memory of the incident. He asks her why she saved his life; she leaves without answering.
63	3	"The Covenant"	Lesli Linka Glatter	Ron Nyswaner	January 29, 2017	6WAH03	1.13
Sekou's plea deal is revoked because of Carrie's meeting with Saad. Carrie reaches out to a former NSA contact to obtain a recording proving that FBI agent Ray Conlin attempted to entrap Sekou on false charges, and uses it to blackmail Conlin into releasing Sekou. Saul arrives in Abu Dhabi to interrogate Farhad Nafisi, an Iranian banker, about a large transfer of funds made from a covert account. Nafisi denies any involvement with North Korea; Saul is unable to prove he is lying and is forced to release him. Dar nonetheless reports to Keane that the U.S. has "conclusive" evidence of Iran's parallel nuclear program; he later eavesdrops on a meeting between Keane and Carrie, who casts doubt on Dar's report. Saul visits his sister in the West Bank and has an unknown contact pick him up at night. Quinn reclaims his gun from the drug dealer who robbed him and lurks outside Carrie's apartment armed with it, believing that someone may be spying on them.
64	4	"A Flash of Light"	Lesli Linka Glatter	Patrick Harbinson	February 12, 2017	6WAH04	1.05
Saul covertly meets with Majid Javadi – still the chief of the IRGC – in the West Bank, and asks him to investigate Nafisi's possible involvement with North Korea. The following day, Saul is detained by Etai Luskin, now working for Mossad, who wants details on the meeting. Keane heeds Carrie's advice and decides not to take immediate action against Iran; Dar retaliates by planting a news story criticizing Keane. Keane asks Carrie for information about Dar that can be used to keep him in line; she reminds Carrie that what is at stake is the implementation of Carrie's ideas on reforming the CIA. Dar later attempts to talk Carrie out of advising Keane. Quinn follows a man living across from Carrie's home and watches him arrive at a warehouse. The following morning, Sekou goes to the same warehouse, where he works, and leaves to make a routine delivery; as he drives into Manhattan, a bomb planted in his van explodes. Saul is freed to return to the U.S. in the wake of the attack.
65	5	"Casus Belli"	Alex Graves	Chip Johannessen	February 19, 2017	6WAH05	1.07
Sekou is publicly identified as a suspect in the bombing and Carrie has to rush to help his family; she leaves Quinn to look after Franny until Latisha, her nanny, arrives. She learns that the recording of Conlin and Saad did not come from her NSA source, but does not know who gave it to her. Carrie is outed as Sekou's defender, which leads to a hostile mob of protesters gathering outside her apartment. When protesters start throwing rocks, an agitated Quinn shoots one of them; he then tells Latisha and Franny to hide in a bathroom. The NYPD surrounds the building and sends in an ESU unit, but Quinn takes an officer hostage, forcing them to abort the operation. Carrie returns home and attempts to talk Quinn down; he claims to have proof she is being spied on. An ESU team storms the apartment and arrests him. Carrie later finds his phone, containing photos of the man across the street, Porteous Belli, and those he took while tailing Belli, and she then sees someone watching her from there.
66	6	"The Return"	Alex Graves	Charlotte Stoudt	February 26, 2017	6WAH06	0.90
Carrie shows Quinn's photos to Conlin, who has Saad confirm that Belli was not Sekou's accomplice. Conlin tracks down the vehicle in the photos to a mysterious private corporation that hires formal federal employees to manage large amounts of sensitive data. He calls Carrie to his home to discuss his findings, but when Carrie arrives, she finds that Conlin was just killed by Belli, from whom she narrowly escapes. After seeing the president on TV in New York, Keane, who has been kept incommunicado, supposedly for her safety, since the bombing, unable to contact even her chief of staff, breaks away from her security detail and returns to the city with them in pursuit. Saul learns that Dar is hiding something from him about the work of a Mossad agent. Quinn, who has been committed to a psychiatric institution, is extracted from his ward at night by Astrid.
67	7	"Imminent Risk"	Tucker Gates	Ron Nyswaner	March 5, 2017	6WAH07	1.44
Carrie is told that Franny has been placed in the care of child protective services, who deem Carrie an imminent risk to her daughter following the situation at her home. Carrie loses in a court hearing, and Franny is put in foster care. Quinn wakes up in a cabin with Astrid, who informs him that Dar secured his release. Dar visits him and reveals that Carrie chose to have him revived from his coma, likely causing his stroke. Javadi arrives in New York; he informs Saul that Farhad Nafisi, who is now dead, was a longtime Mossad asset. Assuming that Dar is working with Mossad, Saul asks Javadi to confirm to Keane that Iran is not running a parallel nuclear program. Dar is revealed to have hired Belli, as well as to have reported Carrie to child services.
68	8	"alt.truth"	Lesli Linka Glatter	Patrick Harbinson	March 12, 2017	6WAH08	1.27
Saul has Carrie facilitate a meeting between Javadi and Keane. However, Javadi changes his story, telling Keane that Iran is in fact violating the nuclear agreement; he later explains to an indignant Saul that he made a deal with Dar out of self-preservation. Keane says to Carrie that she regrets ever having listened to her. It is revealed that right-wing provocateur Brett O'Keefe is working for Dar and is preparing an edited video slandering Keane's late son as a false war hero. While Astrid is out of the cabin, Quinn empties the bullets out of her gun. He spots Belli at a supermarket, but when, after an argument in which he strikes Astrid, he tries to track Belli down on his own, he ends up attacking a stranger by mistake. On returning to the cabin, he attempts to reconcile with Astrid, telling her he needs her help. In the dark, Belli starts shooting at them, wounding Quinn and killing Astrid when she tries to defend them using the empty gun. Quinn escapes by jumping in the lake and staying underwater until Belli leaves.
69	9	"Sock Puppets"	Dan Attias	Chip Johannessen & Evan Wright	March 19, 2017	6WAH09	1.26
Dar betrays Javadi to Mossad; Javadi covertly calls Carrie to allow her to trace his location, but he is extracted before she and Saul arrive. Carrie finds Javadi's phone, which contains footage of Nafisi confessing his allegiance to Mossad. Carrie and Saul present the footage to Keane as evidence that Dar is behind the conspiracy to mislead her about Iran. Keane involves the current solicitor general, whom she intends to appoint as attorney general in her administration; he advises Carrie to testify that Dar covered up the Russian infiltration of the CIA's Berlin station, which would be a ground for prosecuting him. Carrie, aware that her doing so would disgrace Saul, says she has to speak with him first. Max goes to work undercover at the private company Conlin was investigating, and learns that it is a massive troll farm run by O'Keefe. Quinn ambushes Dar at his home and is told Dar did not order the hit on him and Astrid, but he hears Dar then call Belli to remonstrate with him; Belli tells Dar that someone else ordered the hit. Quinn is able to trace the call to Belli's location.
70	10	"The Flag House"	Michael Klick	Alex Gansa	March 26, 2017	6WAH10	1.43
Quinn tracks Belli to a house used to plan black ops missions, including ones Quinn was part of; he finds Sekou's van parked in the garage. Carrie prepares to make her deposition, but learns that a scheduled appointment to see Franny has been cancelled. Realizing Dar is blackmailing her, Carrie opts out of making her statement, after which she is allowed to see Franny. After being rebuffed by Keane, Dar tells O'Keefe to release the video against Keane's son. Max covertly records a video of Dar meeting with O'Keefe and sends it to Carrie, after which he is accosted by O'Keefe's security team. Saul prepares to go into hiding, but Mira talks him out of it; he goes to Carrie's house and, although she is not there, he sees the video Max sent her. Carrie is taken to see Quinn, who has secured a vantage point to watch the black ops house through a rifle sight; he shows her that Belli is in the house.
71	11	"R Is for Romeo"	Seith Mann	Chip Johannessen & Patrick Harbinson	April 2, 2017	6WAH11	1.34
Saul shows Max's video to Keane to convince her that Dar has been working with O'Keefe to defame her son. O'Keefe publicly invites Keane to appear on his show, which she accepts on Saul's recommendation. On a live broadcast, she accuses O'Keefe of spreading disinformation and exposes the fact that his social media firm is government-funded. Dar enlists Max's help in uncovering a website being prepared by O'Keefe that impersonates Quinn and targets Keane. Carrie enters the black ops house; after seeing that the van is in fact Sekou's, she is ambushed by Belli; Quinn intervenes and brutally murders Belli as revenge for Astrid's death. The solicitor general arrives with FBI agents, planning to use the van as evidence to prosecute Dar; as well, he has promised to grant Quinn immunity. Quinn uncovers evidence suggesting that the special ops team is involved in a planned attack on Keane. Carrie calls Keane's chief of staff to try to warn them, but a bomb hidden in the house's garage explodes, destroying the van, killing several people including the solicitor general, and temporarily knocking her out.
72	12	"America First"	Lesli Linka Glatter	Alex Gansa & Ron Nyswaner	April 9, 2017	6WAH12	1.90
Carrie and Quinn rush to Keane's headquarters, where the staff receive word of a bomb threat in the building. As they evacuate, Dar calls Carrie and warns that the threat is a ruse to lure Keane out of her hotel so she can be assassinated, with Quinn to be framed as the killer. Carrie stops Keane's car from leaving just before a bomb detonates outdoors. Quinn finds Carrie and Keane and escorts them to safety by driving through a barricade of armed soldiers sent to kill Keane; he is shot and dies once they are safe. Six weeks later, Keane has been inaugurated, and Carrie is working as her liaison to the intelligence community; several senior intelligence officials, including Dar, have been incarcerated. Dar tells Saul he did not intend what ultimately happened; he simply lost control of what he set in motion. Carrie is given a favorable report by her caseworker, which means she should be able to regain custody of Franny. She gets a call from Saul, who is being arrested, and learns that Keane is having dozens of innocent government officials apprehended in retaliation for the assassination attempt.

== Production ==
The season's episodes’ opening includes excerpts from The Revolution Will Not Be Televised.

=== Development ===
On December 9, 2015, the series was renewed for a sixth season. On August 11, 2016, at the 2016 Summer TCA Press Tour it was announced that filming of the season would begin in August 2016 in New York City. Showrunners Alex Gansa and Howard Gordon along with Gideon Raff, Chip Johannessen, Michael Klick, Patrick Harbinson, Lesli Linka Glatter, Avi Nir, Ran Telem, and Claire Danes are executive producers.

In September 2016, co-star Rupert Friend sustained an injury to his foot, forcing production to shoot around his character Peter Quinn. Also announced that month was that the production would return to film scenes in Morocco (subbing for Abu Dhabi and Israel), where the series had not filmed since its third season. A promotional poster and a behind-the-scenes video was released on November 17, 2016.

=== Casting ===
On July 27, 2016, Elizabeth Marvel was cast in the role of Elizabeth Keane, a senator from New York who was just elected to be the next President of the United States. On August 10, 2016, it was announced that Hill Harper and Patrick Sabongui joined the cast. On August 16, 2016, Robert Knepper joined the cast in the recurring role of General Jamie McClendon, the Department of Defense representative. On September 10, 2016, it was announced that Dominic Fumusa had joined as FBI Special Agent Ray Conlin.

== Reception ==
=== Critical reception ===
The sixth season of Homeland received mixed to positive reviews from critics. On Metacritic, the season has a score of 68 out of 100 based on 15 reviews. On Rotten Tomatoes, it has an approval rating of 78% with an average rating of 7.45 out of 10 based on 169 reviews. The site's critical consensus is, "Homeland delivers introspective comfort food with a satisfyingly strong leading female character and storylines that continue to surprise."

=== Accolades ===
For the 69th Primetime Emmy Awards, the series received three nominations–Mandy Patinkin for Outstanding Supporting Actor in a Drama Series, Lesli Linka Glatter for Outstanding Directing for a Drama Series for "America First", and Outstanding Sound Editing for a Series for "America First". This is the first season in which Claire Danes has not been nominated for Outstanding Lead Actress in a Drama Series.
