= Beside Still Waters =

Beside Still Waters is a phrase used in the 23rd psalm of the Book of Psalms. It could also refer to:

- Beside Still Waters (book), a 1998 book by Greg Easterbrook
- Beside Still Waters (film), a 2014 film directed by Chris Lowell
