= R Is for Romeo =

- Homeland episode
- Episode no.: Season 6 Episode 11
- Directed by: Seith Mann
- Written by: Chip Johannessen; Patrick Harbinson
- Production code: 6WAH11
- Original air date: April 2, 2017
- Running time: 48 minutes

Guest appearances
- Maury Sterling as Max; Hill Harper as Rob Emmons; C.J. Wilson as Porteous Belli; Jake Weber as Brett O’Keefe; David Thornton as George Pallis; James Mount as Agent Thoms; Julee Cerda as Reiko Umon

Episode chronology
← Previous "The Flag House"	Next → "America First"
- Homeland season 6

"R Is for Romeo" is the eleventh episode of the sixth season of the American television drama series Homeland, and the 71st episode overall. It premiered on Showtime on April 2, 2017.

== Plot ==
Quinn (Rupert Friend) explains to Carrie (Claire Danes) that he found Sekou's original van, which had been swapped for one loaded with a bomb, in the garage of the flag house. Carrie notes that the conspirators can all be brought to justice with that evidence, but Quinn responds that he wants to kill Belli (C.J. Wilson) regardless. A disagreement leads to Quinn revealing that he knows Carrie woke him up from his coma in Berlin, causing him to suffer a stroke.

Saul (Mandy Patinkin) presents President-elect Keane (Elizabeth Marvel) with the evidence that links Dar Adal (F. Murray Abraham) to Brett O'Keefe (Jake Weber). O'Keefe publicly takes credit for distributing the Andrew Keane video and invites the president-elect to appear on his show. Keane accepts the offer. On the live broadcast, Keane declares that O'Keefe manipulated the video of Andrew Keane, manufactured the online reactions with his own social media firm, and that his firm is actually being funded by people in the government.

Max (Maury Sterling) gets a meal tray delivered to him which includes an access card, enabling him to escape the facility. When he exits, he is immediately grabbed by men who forcibly deliver him to Dar Adal. Dar asks Max for help in ascertaining what O'Keefe is planning in regards to Quinn. Max hacks into the corporation's data backups and unearths a large number of online communications, purporting to be from Quinn, portraying him as a volatile ex-soldier with an extreme vendetta against Elizabeth Keane.

When morning breaks, Quinn leaves, claiming to be trailing the special ops group. He tells Carrie how to get into the flag house. Carrie investigates the seemingly empty house, only to be attacked by Belli. As she tries to fight him off, Quinn storms in, shooting Belli and then brutally beating him to death. Quinn explains himself by telling Carrie how Astrid died at Belli's hands. FBI responders arrive on the scene, along with Solicitor General Pallis (David Thornton), who assures Carrie that Quinn will be granted immunity.

Quinn inspects partially erased letters from the whiteboard in the house, trying to determine the special ops group's current assignment. Being familiar with the code they use, he is able to narrow the location of their assignment down to "B" (for Bravo time zone, indicating Middle East) or "R" (Romeo, indicating East Coast of the U.S.). Carrie grows concerned at the latter possibility, and calls Rob (Hill Harper) in order to check on the President-elect. Carrie watches from the front yard as FBI personnel open the garage door, triggering a hidden bomb in the garage, which explodes. Carrie and Quinn check for survivors as the episode ends.

== Production ==
The episode was directed by Seith Mann and co-written by executive producers Chip Johannessen and Patrick Harbinson.

== Reception ==
=== Reviews ===
The episode received an approval rating of 91% with an average score of 7.3 out of 10 on the review aggregator Rotten Tomatoes, with the site's consensus stating "'R Is for Romeo' ties together the various narrative arcs of Homeland's sixth season -- and then pulls the rug out with an impressive flurry of violence, explosions, twists, turns, and cliffhanging revelations".

Cynthia Littleton of Variety wrote a positive review, saying the episode is "packed with fiery moments that allow every key player in the ensemble to shine as the end draws near", and adding that it "succeeds in offering a commentary on the most troubling aspects of our political culture". Kelli Bamforth of Entertainment Weekly rated the episode a B+, concluding that it "succeeded in pulling together nearly nine hours’ worth of storytelling to provide a clearer picture of season 6’s overarching narrative".

=== Ratings ===
The original broadcast was watched by 1.34 million viewers.
