= Sock puppet (disambiguation) =

A sock puppet is a hand puppet made from a sock.

Sock puppet may also refer to:

- Sock puppet account, a false online identity used for deception
- "Sock Puppets" (Homeland), an episode of the television series Homeland
- Burlington Sock Puppets, a North Carolinian baseball team
