= Imminent Risk =

- Homeland episode
- Episode no.: Season 6 Episode 7
- Directed by: Tucker Gates
- Written by: Ron Nyswaner
- Production code: 6WAH07
- Original air date: March 5, 2017
- Running time: 53 minutes

Guest appearances
- Maury Sterling as Max; Patrick Sabongui as Reda Hashem; C.J. Wilson as Porteous Belli; Robert Knepper as General Jamie McClendon; Marin Hinkle as Christine Lonas; Bernard White as Farhad Nafisi; Anthony Azizi as Naser; Seth Numrich as Nate Joseph; Martha Raddatz as herself; Orlagh Cassidy as Rachel Crofts; Alain Washnevsky as Amir Bastami; Adam Grupper as judge; Nina Hoss as Astrid; Shaun Toub as Majid Javadi

Episode chronology
← Previous "The Return"	Next → "alt.truth"
- Homeland season 6

"Imminent Risk" is the seventh episode of the sixth season of the American television drama series Homeland, and the 67th episode overall. It premiered on Showtime on March 5, 2017.

== Plot ==
Carrie (Claire Danes) learns that Frannie has been picked up by child protective services while at school. Carrie makes her case to investigator Christine Lonas (Marin Hinkle), who has determined that Frannie is in imminent risk of further harm after the recent incident with Quinn. The case is presented to a judge the next day. Christine cites Quinn's volatile presence and Carrie's bipolar disorder among other things, and the judge rules in favor of child services. Frannie is put into a foster home.

Quinn (Rupert Friend) wakes up in a secluded cabin with Astrid (Nina Hoss) keeping watch over him. Astrid informs him that Dar Adal (F. Murray Abraham) secured Quinn's release on the condition that he stays out of the public eye. Quinn is resistant and attempts to hitchhike back to New York before Astrid catches him. That night, Dar Adal stops by. Recognizing that Quinn is being tempted back to New York by Carrie's situation, Dar reveals to Quinn that Carrie made the decision to have Quinn awakened from his coma, likely causing the stroke that he suffered.

Javadi (Shaun Toub) arrives in New York to report back to Saul (Mandy Patinkin). Dar arranges to have Saul delayed by the Agency on the pretence of an internal debriefing regarding his alleged meeting with Javadi in the West Bank. In the meantime, on his way to the meeting, Javadi is kidnapped by three Iranian men. They tie him in a chair and torture him while accusing him of being a traitor, saying that they have been tipped off about this from someone within the CIA. However, Amir (Alain Washnevsky), one of the Iranians, is loyal to Javadi and rescues him by shooting the other two captors; Amir reveals that he served in the Iranian military with Javadi. Javadi finally makes his meeting with Saul and demands to know who could have tipped off the Iranians that he was in New York. Saul replies that only Dar Adal could have had the knowledge. Javadi tells Saul that Nafisi confessed that he was actually working for Mossad and that his trip to Abu Dhabi and performance in Israel were a charade. Saul asks Javadi to confirm personally to the President-elect that Iran has no parallel nuclear program in North Korea. Javadi shoots and kills Amir.

A despondent Carrie gets drunk and makes a phone call to President-elect Keane (Elizabeth Marvel), asking her to intervene. Keane only responds that such a thing would be unethical, and asks Carrie if she has been drinking. Christine receives a follow-up call from Dar, confirming that it was he who reported Carrie to child services.

== Production ==
The episode was directed by Tucker Gates and written by co-executive producer Ron Nyswaner.

== Reception ==
=== Reviews ===
The episode received a rating of 82% with an average score of 6.37 out of 10 on the review aggregator Rotten Tomatoes, with the site's consensus stating "The grimly entertaining 'Imminent Risk' powers past narrative weaknesses with a solid followup to its action-packed predecessor.".

Shirley Li of Entertainment Weekly gave the episode a B grade. She wrote "Javadi always proves an intriguing presence (much of this is thanks to Shaun Toub’s mesmerizing performance)", while also calling Carrie's battle with child services "a bizarre, conspicuous twist". Brian Tallerico of New York Magazine rated the episode 3 out of 5 stars, also citing Carrie's storyline as the weak point of the episode, saying "Carrie feels too much like a pawn in a plot device machine".

=== Ratings ===
The original broadcast was watched by 1.44 million viewers.
