= The Flag House =

- Homeland episode
- Episode no.: Season 6 Episode 10
- Directed by: Michael Klick
- Written by: Alex Gansa
- Production code: 6WAH10
- Original air date: March 26, 2017
- Running time: 54 minutes

Guest appearances
- Maury Sterling as Max; Hill Harper as Rob Emmons; Sarita Choudhury as Mira Berenson; C.J. Wilson as Porteous Belli; Jake Weber as Brett O’Keefe; Robert Knepper as General Jamie McClendon; Marin Hinkle as Christine Lonas; James Mount as Agent Thoms; David Thornton as George Pallis; Mickey O'Hagan as Clarice; Erin Darke as Nicki; Dov Tiefenbach; Vin Knight; Bradford Anderson as Trent; Julee Cerda as Reiko Umon

Episode chronology
← Previous "Sock Puppets"	Next → "R Is for Romeo"
- Homeland season 6

"The Flag House" is the tenth episode of the sixth season of the American television drama series Homeland, and the 70th episode overall. It premiered on Showtime on March 26, 2017.

== Plot ==
Zeroing in on the location of Belli (C.J. Wilson) via the phone trace, Quinn (Rupert Friend) ends up in a neighborhood familiar to him. The GPS takes him to a diner where he catches up with a waitress (Erin Darke) who recognizes him and calls him "Johnny". Quinn then goes to a nearby house with a U.S. flag posted outside. Knowing where a key is hidden, he gains access. Once inside, he has a flashback: a meeting he had in the same house with fellow black ops soldiers, with McClendon (Robert Knepper) there giving the orders. Back in present day, a group of men arrive at the house, compelling Quinn to sneak out through the garage, in which he sees a Medina Medley van.

Dar Adal (F. Murray Abraham) has a combative meeting with President-elect Keane (Elizabeth Marvel): Dar makes veiled threats after Keane accuses him of feeding her bad intelligence and leaking falsehoods to the press. Dar directs Brett O'Keefe (Jake Weber) to release the video of Andrew Keane's final moments which has been manipulated to make him seem cowardly. With the backing of O'Keefe's mass of social media accounts, the video quickly goes viral. Max (Maury Sterling) sees Dar talking to O'Keefe and sends video footage to Carrie, though a co-worker reports him for using a phone in a forbidden area.

Saul (Mandy Patinkin) prepares to leave the country and go into hiding, anticipating Carrie's testimony which would implicate him. However, a final conversation with his ex-wife, Mira (Sarita Choudhury), causes him to have a change of heart. Saul goes to Carrie's apartment; he lets himself in when Carrie does not answer the door. He notices a new correspondence from Max on Carrie's laptop and watches the video of Dar conferring with O'Keefe.

Carrie (Claire Danes) gets dropped off to submit her deposition. Her driver makes a suspicious comment about confirming her appointment with child services to visit Frannie. Carrie calls and learns that the appointment was cancelled due to Frannie coming down with a fever. She gets sworn in but suddenly aborts the deposition and leaves. Rob (Hill Harper) demands an explanation, to which Carrie responds "my kid is sick. They still won't let me see her". Keane visits Carrie. Unable to change Carrie's mind, Keane is able to surmise that Carrie is being blackmailed by Dar Adal. Not long after cancelling the deposition, Carrie hears from child services that there was a mistake, and she is allowed to see Frannie as scheduled. Upon returning home, Carrie is approached by Clarice (Mickey O'Hagan) who brings her to see Quinn. Quinn shows Carrie that he has secured a vantage point next door to the "flag house" with a sniper rifle pointed at the men inside.

== Production ==
The episode was directed by executive producer Michael Klick and written by showrunner Alex Gansa.

== Reception ==
=== Reviews ===
The episode received an approval rating of 100% with an average score of 8.12 out of 10 on the review aggregator Rotten Tomatoes, with the site's consensus stating "'The Flag House' propels Homeland's main characters to turning points in their respective arcs, positioning the show's heroes for an inevitable showdown in the final act".

Ethan Renner of The Baltimore Sun gave the episode a very positive review, stating "This was the latest in a series of excellent Homeland episodes, and one of the show's better outings since the incredible first season" Aaron Riccio of Slant Magazine described the scene of Keane reacting to the video of her son "one of Homeland's rawest emotional moments to date". Brian Tallerico of New York Magazine rated the episode 4 out of 5 stars. Tallerico wrote "At its best, the show humanizes those in positions of power, and that’s what happens with the Carrie and Keane arcs in 'The Flag House'" and of Elizabeth Marvel's performance "Marvel beautifully sells both the deep emotion and the righteous fury of this betrayal of Andrew’s memory and bravery".

=== Ratings ===
The original broadcast was watched by 1.43 million viewers.
