= Alt.truth =

"alt.truth"
- Homeland episode
- Episode no.: Season 6 Episode 8
- Directed by: Lesli Linka Glatter
- Written by: Patrick Harbinson
- Production code: 6WAH08
- Original air date: March 12, 2017
- Running time: 56 minutes

Guest appearances
- Maury Sterling as Max; Hill Harper as Rob Emmons; C.J. Wilson as Porteous Belli; Jake Weber as Brett O’Keefe; James Mount as Agent Thoms; Chris Coy as Rudy; Gabriel Fazio as Frank Kolacek; Nina Hoss as Astrid; Shaun Toub as Majid Javadi

Episode chronology
← Previous "Imminent Risk"	Next → "Sock Puppets"
- Homeland season 6

"alt.truth" is the eighth episode of the sixth season of the American television drama series Homeland, and the 68th episode overall. It premiered on Showtime on March 12, 2017.

== Plot ==
Saul (Mandy Patinkin) visits Carrie (Claire Danes) at her home and finds her distraught about losing her daughter. He takes Carrie to Franny's foster home and parks across the street so Carrie can see that her daughter is in good care. Saul asks a now calm Carrie to help facilitate a meeting between Majid Javadi (Shaun Toub) and President-elect Elizabeth Keane (Elizabeth Marvel). At the meeting, Javadi tells Keane that Nafisi did make payments to North Korea and that there is reason to believe Iran is contravening the nuclear agreement. Carrie and Saul are blindsided, having expected Javadi to say the opposite. After Keane leaves, Saul demands answers from Javadi. Javadi admits that he aligned himself with Dar Adal, having concluded that Dar's influence in the CIA far exceeds Saul's.

Quinn (Rupert Friend), increasingly paranoid of Astrid and Dar Adal, finds Astrid's gun in her car and empties the bullets. He also thinks he sees Astrid talking to Belli (C.J. Wilson) at the supermarket. When Quinn confronts Astrid with his suspicions and only gets denials, he punches her in the stomach and leaves to track down the neighbor, having seen his truck at a motel. However, when he stakes out the motel, he ends up attacking an innocent stranger. While Quinn apologizes to Astrid for his actions after returning, he is grazed in the head by a bullet through the window, fired by Belli. Astrid rushes out to her car to get her gun and is killed due to the gun not being loaded. The attacker targets Quinn next, hitting him in the shoulder and knocking him into the lake. He fires several shots into the water and, satisfied that Quinn must be dead, flees the scene. Quinn emerges from the water shortly thereafter.

== Production ==
The episode was directed by executive producer Lesli Linka Glatter and written by executive producer Patrick Harbinson.

== Reception ==
=== Reviews ===
The episode received a rating of 73% with an average score of 6.59 out of 10 on the review aggregator Rotten Tomatoes, with the site's consensus stating "Highlighted by masterful performances, 'Alt.Truth' increasingly focuses on the core vulnerabilities of Carrie, Saul, Quinn and Astrid, setting up explosive confrontations to come in the final act".

Cynthia Littleton of Variety reviewed the episode very positively, calling it "the best hour of Homeland’s sixth season so far. It has everything that Homeland does best". Littleton praised both Glatter's directing and Harbinson's writing, and noted in regards to the directing "the look and feel of each sequence changes markedly depending on the primary character".

Ethan Renner of The Baltimore Sun described the episode's climax at the lake house as "another in a series of great, intense action sequences this season".

=== Ratings ===
The original broadcast was watched by 1.27 million viewers.
