= Summer '03 =

- Theatrical release poster
- Directed by: Becca Gleason
- Written by: Becca Gleason
- Produced by: Alexandre Dauman; Eyal Rimmon
- Starring: Joey King; Jack Kilmer; Andrea Savage; Erin Darke; Kelly Lamor Wilson; Stephen Ruffin; Paul Scheer; June Squibb
- Cinematography: Ben Hardwicke
- Edited by: Josie Azzam
- Music by: Nathan Matthew David
- Production company: Big Cat Productions
- Distributed by: Blue Fox Entertainment
- Release dates: March 10, 2018 (SXSW); September 28, 2018 (United States)
- Running time: 95 minutes
- Country: United States
- Language: English
- Box office: $11,746

Summer '03 is a 2018 American comedy-drama film written and directed by Becca Gleason. The film stars Joey King, Jack Kilmer, Andrea Savage, Erin Darke, Kelly Lamor Wilson, Stephen Ruffin, Paul Scheer and June Squibb. It was released on September 28, 2018, by Blue Fox Entertainment.

== Cast ==
- Joey King as Jamie Winkle, a young girl who is dealing with her grandmother's death
- Jack Kilmer as Luke
- Andrea Savage as Shira Winkle, Jamie's overbearing mother who tries to keep Jamie in line
- Erin Darke as Hope
- Kelly Lamor Wilson as Emily
- Stephen Ruffin as March
- Paul Scheer as Ned Winkle
- June Squibb as Dotty Winkle
- Steffan Argus as Josh
- Monica Mathis as Jamie's Friend
- Logan Medina as Dylan
- Travis James as Buck
- John Weselcouch as Doctor Spaulding
- Elise DuQuette as Officer Quincy
- Bill Eudaly as Father Patrick
- Paul Ryden as Randall Smithton
- Jared Gray as Nico
- Nick Caruso as Ranger Todd Brown
- Rick Andosca as Herman
- Melissa Youngblood as Laura Tomlinson
- Morgan Savoy as Stephanie Willis
- Hayden Burrell as Young Ned's friend

== Production ==
Principal photography began on September 19, 2017, in Atlanta, Georgia.

== Release ==
The film premiered at South by Southwest on March 10, 2018. The film was released on September 28, 2018, by Blue Fox Entertainment.

== Reception ==
Summer '03 received mixed reviews from critics. On the review aggregator website Rotten Tomatoes, 63% of 24 critics' reviews are positive, with an average rating of 6.4/10. The website's consensus reads: "A cool scoop of cliché that doesn't completely melt under pressure, Summer of 03 goes down easy thanks to Becca Gleason's earnest direction." On Metacritic, the film has a weighted average score of 45% based on reviews from five critics.
