= Gregg Easterbrook =

American writer (born 1953)

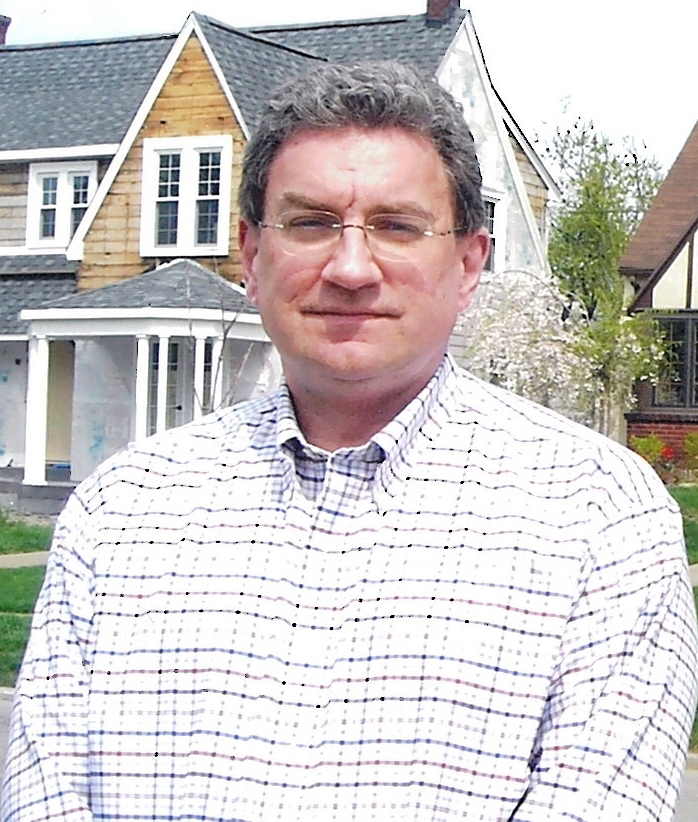
- Easterbrook in 2008
- Born: Gregg Edmund Easterbrook; March 3, 1953 (age 73); Buffalo, New York, U.S.
- Education: Colorado College (BA); Northwestern University (MA)
- Occupations: Author and journalist
- Relatives: Frank Easterbrook (brother)
- Website: www.greggeasterbrook.com

Gregg Edmund Easterbrook (born March 3, 1953) is an American writer and a contributing editor of both The New Republic and The Atlantic Monthly. He has authored ten books (six nonfiction, one of humor, and three literary novels), and writes for op-ed pages, magazines, and journals.

== Early life and education ==
Gregg Easterbrook was born in Buffalo, New York, the son of George Easterbrook, a dentist, and Vimy Hoover Easterbrook, a teacher. Easterbrook attended Kenmore West High School in Tonawanda, New York. He has a bachelor's degree in political science from Colorado College and a master's in journalism from Northwestern University.

== Career ==
In 1979, Easterbrook became an editor of The Washington Monthly. In 1981, he joined The Atlantic as a staff writer, later becoming national correspondent; since 1988, he has been a contributing editor.

Easterbrook has been a political columnist for Reuters, a senior editor and then contributing editor to The New Republic, and a fellow in economic studies and then in governance studies at the Brookings Institution (that fellowship lasted for nine years up until 2011). He has lectured at the Aspen Institute and Chautauqua Institution, and spoken at many colleges.

Easterbrook's journalistic style has been characterized as "hyper-logical" and he himself as "a thoughtful, deliberate, and precise journalist ... a polymath and a quick study." His areas of interest include environmental policy, global warming, space policy, social science research, Christian theology, and sports — especially professional football. In 2017, he was elected to the American Academy of Arts & Sciences.

=== Football column ===
Easterbrook writes the eclectic football column "Tuesday Morning Quarterback" (TMQ), originally published by Slate in 2000, and then on ESPN.com starting in 2002. TMQ was published for two weeks on the independent website Football Outsiders, and then by NFL.com, moving back to ESPN.com prior to the 2006 season. The column relocated to the New York Times in 2015, then to The Weekly Standard in 2017. The column went on hiatus for the 2019 season and resumed with the 2023 season, as a newsletter.

Fans of the TMQ column include journalist Chuck Todd who has described it as "the best and most compelling sports column anywhere". Detractors include Drew Magary (then an editor at the website Deadspin) who said of one Easterbrook column that his thesis lacks "any basis in reality".

=== A Moment on the Earth ===
Easterbrook wrote the book A Moment on the Earth (1995), subtitled "the coming age of environmental optimism," which presaged Bjørn Lomborg's book The Skeptical Environmentalist, first published in Danish three years later; Easterbrook argued that many environmental indicators, with the notable exception of greenhouse gas production, are positive. He called the environmental movement "among the most welcome social developments of the twentieth century," but criticized environmentalists who promoted what he saw as overly pessimistic views that did not accept signs of improvement and progress.

A Moment on the Earth proved to be very controversial, especially among environmentalists. Easterbrook was accused of mischaracterizing data concerning environmental health, using faulty logic, and being overly optimistic. Other reviewers, like Michael Specter in The New York Times, had praise for the book's efforts to raise positive points in the debate over environmental policy.

Norman Borlaug, one of the most important figures in the Green Revolution, was the subject of an admiring Easterbrook article in 1997, and again in 2009 marking Borlaug's passing. Both articles said that Borlaug had disproved the earlier dire predictions of Paul R. Ehrlich, author of the 1968 book The Population Bomb. Ehrlich has severely criticized Easterbrook's 1995 book A Moment on the Earth.

Until 2006, Easterbrook was skeptical about whether global warming was a serious manmade problem, pointing out several times that even the National Academy of Sciences had expressed doubt about whether global warming was caused by humans. He publicly modified his position in 2006 as a result of scientific developments. Easterbrook wrote:

[T]he science has changed from ambiguous to near-unanimous. As an environmental commentator, I have a long record of opposing alarmism. But based on the data I'm now switching sides regarding global warming, from skeptic to convert. Once global-warming science was too uncertain to form the basis of policy decisions — and this was hardly just the contention of oil executives. ... Clearly, the question called for more research. That research is now in, and it shows a strong scientific consensus that an artificially warming world is a real phenomenon posing real danger. ...

He says that greenhouse gas emissions must be curbed in order to win the fight against climate change. Easterbrook anticipates that climate change could benefit some regions, even while causing drastic problems elsewhere.

=== Other books ===
Easterbrook has written three novels: This Magic Moment (1986), The Here and Now (2002) and The Leading Indicators (2012). This Magic Moment is a love story as well as a philosophical work about the meaning of life. The second novel (The Here and Now) was called "moving" by both the New York Times Book Review and the Los Angeles Times, and tells a "satisfying tale of disillusionment and redemption" in the opinion of the San Francisco Chronicle. According to Kirkus Reviews, The Leading Indicators provides social commentary in the form of literary fiction, filtering "leveraged buyouts, derivatives marketing and multimillion-dollar CEO bonuses through the lens of one ... family."

Among his nonfiction books, Beside Still Waters (1998) is a work of Christian theology, discussing whether religion matters as much as it did before we gained so much knowledge about ourselves and the world. The book Tuesday Morning Quarterback (2001) — not to be confused with his similar column of the same name — uses haiku and humor to analyze pro football.

Another of Easterbrook's books, focusing on social science, is The Progress Paradox: How Life Gets Better While People Feel Worse (2003), which explores people's perception of their own well-being. The book cites statistical data indicating that Americans are better off in terms of material goods and amount of free time but are not happier than before. Easterbrook argues that this has occurred due to choice anxiety (too many decisions to make) and abundance denial (not realizing how well we are doing). His proposed remedy is to make our lives more meaningful by doing good while living well.

His book Sonic Boom: Globalization at Mach Speed (2009) asserts that globalization has only just begun and is a good thing to look forward to. Another book, The King of Sports: Football's Impact on America (2013) says that American football in many ways reflects the cultural contradictions of the United States.

=== Other activities and areas of interest ===
Easterbrook was a longtime critic of the Space Shuttle program. After the Challenger disaster in 1986, his prescience made him a frequent commentator on space issues. He has also been critical of the International Space Station, because of its expense and the feasibility of conducting the same experiments on Earth instead of in orbit. Easterbrook has called a proposed crewed mission to Mars "ridiculously impractical", and has written that the rationale for a proposed permanent base on the Moon is closely tied to pork barrel politics. He has supported other NASA projects such as using uncrewed space probes and protecting Earth from asteroids.

Easterbrook had a blog at The New Republic Online, until mid-2004. In October 2003, he wrote a blog post critical of what he considered to be the senseless violence in the Quentin Tarantino film Kill Bill, saying that, "Recent European history alone ought to cause Jewish [movie] executives to experience second thoughts about glorifying the killing of the helpless as a fun lifestyle choice." This caused an uproar, and Easterbrook wrote that he "mangled" his own ideas by his choice of words, and apologized. The New Republic accepted blame for the piece in a further apology, and denied that his comments were intentionally anti-Semitic. Disney, the parent of the film's distributor Miramax Films and ESPN, fired Easterbrook in October 2003.

Besides writing for many magazines, journals, and op-ed pages on a wide variety of subjects, and producing books of his own, Easterbook has also written various book chapters. An example is a book chapter about the 9-11 terrorist attacks.

== Personal ==
Easterbrook is married to Nan Kennelly, an American diplomat. He is the brother of Judge Frank H. Easterbrook and Neil Easterbrook, English professor at Texas Christian University. Gregg Easterbrook lives in Bethesda, Maryland.

== Bibliography ==
- The Blue Age: How the US Navy Created Global Prosperity—And Why We're in Danger of Losing It (PublicAffairs, 2021). ISBN 1541742540
- It's Better Than It Looks: Reasons for Optimism in an Age of Fear (PublicAffairs, 2018). ISBN 9781610397414
- The Game's Not Over: In Defense of Football (PublicAffairs, 2015). ISBN 9781610396486
- The King of Sports: Football's Impact on America (St. Martin's, 2013). ISBN 125001171X.
- Leading Indicators (St. Martin's, 2012). ISBN 1250011736.
- Sonic Boom (Random House, 2009). ISBN 0812974131
- The Progress Paradox (Random House, 2003). ISBN 0812973038
- The Here and Now (St. Martin's, 2002). ISBN 0312286473
- Tuesday Morning Quarterback (Universe 2001). ISBN 0789306514
- Beside Still Waters (William Morrow. 1998). ISBN 0688160654
- A Moment on the Earth (Viking, 1995). ISBN 0140154515
- This Magic Moment (St. Martin's, 1986). ISBN 0312800541

== Awards and honors ==
- Investigative Reporters and Editors Award, 1980 and 1982
- Livingston Award, 1985
- Honorary doctorate, Colorado College, 1992
- Fiftieth Anniversary Distinguished Fellow, Fulbright Foundation, 1996
- Fellow of the American Academy of Arts & Sciences, 2017
