= Sock Puppets (Homeland) =

- Homeland episode
- Episode no.: Season 6 Episode 9
- Directed by: Dan Attias
- Written by: Chip Johannessen; Evan Wright
- Production code: 6WAH09
- Original air date: March 19, 2017
- Running time: 50 minutes

Guest appearances
- Maury Sterling as Max; Hill Harper as Rob Emmons; C.J. Wilson as Porteous Belli; Jake Weber as Brett O’Keefe; David Thornton as George Pallis; Seth Numrich as Nate Joseph; Bernard White as Farhad Nafisi; David Adkins as Doctor Schouten; Bradford Anderson as Trent; Nina Hoss as Astrid; Shaun Toub as Majid Javadi

Episode chronology
← Previous "alt.truth"	Next → "The Flag House"
- Homeland season 6

"Sock Puppets" is the ninth episode of the sixth season of the American television drama series Homeland, and the 69th episode overall. It premiered on Showtime on March 19, 2017.

== Plot ==
Dar Adal (F. Murray Abraham) betrays Javadi (Shaun Toub) by revealing his location to Mossad, who are eager to interrogate him regarding the IRGC's operations. Grasping his situation, Javadi secretly calls Carrie (Claire Danes) and puts his phone in speaker mode, allowing her to hear what is happening. Carrie and Saul (Mandy Patinkin) have the call traced, but arrive at Javadi's hotel room well after he has been taken away by Mossad operatives, though they do find the phone he left behind. On his phone is the footage of Farhad Nafisi (Bernard White) confessing that he was working for Mossad. Carrie and Saul present this evidence to President-elect Keane (Elizabeth Marvel). Along with Dar Adal's involvement and the framing of Sekou Bah, they convince Keane that Dar, along with elements of Mossad, have been conspiring to falsely paint Iran as having violated the nuclear agreement.

Max (Maury Sterling) follows up on Conlin's death and traces the location of Conlin's last phone call to the tech startup he was investigating. Aiming to learn more about the outfit, Max responds to one of their job postings. Max is interviewed and hired by Brett O'Keefe (Jake Weber). Max soon comes to learn that the organization's primary function is to control a massive number of fake social media accounts in order to push O'Keefe's political agendas online.

Keane brings the solicitor general, George Pallis (David Thornton), into the fold to advise on Dar Adal. Pallis states that there is simply not enough evidence directly linking Dar to the conspiracy. He recommends that the only way to bring down Dar is for Carrie to testify that Dar covered up the infiltration by a Russian agent in the CIA Berlin station. Carrie is reluctant as it would lead to Saul being disgraced due to his relationship at the time with Allison, who was the mole. Carrie meets Saul and explains, much to his dismay, that it is currently their only course of action.

Dar goes home to find that Quinn (Rupert Friend) is waiting for him inside. When confronted about the killing of Astrid and attempt on Quinn's life, Dar insists that he had nothing to do with it, even going as far as to say that he loves Quinn like a son and would do nothing to hurt him. Quinn pistol-whips Dar and leaves. Dar calls Belli (C.J. Wilson), demanding to know why he defied instructions to leave Quinn alone. The man responds that "there were other opinions". Dar informs him that Quinn is still alive. Quinn is shown outside nearby, listening to their phone conversation via a Stingray device.

== Production ==
The episode was directed by Dan Attias and co-written by executive producer Chip Johannessen and supervising producer Evan Wright.

== Reception ==
=== Reviews ===
The episode received an approval rating of 89% on the review aggregator Rotten Tomatoes, with the site's consensus stating " Intriguing character beats and compelling plot twists make 'Sock Puppets' emblematic of Homeland at its best -- and the strongest episode of the season to date".

Matt Brennan of Paste rated the episode 8.1 out of 10, declaring "Homeland thus recovers from the season’s weakest entry with its strongest so far, returning to the subject that’s sustained it from the outset: The awful truth that our errors of judgment remain with us forever, even as time itself moves on" Brennan also praised the performance of Claire Danes in the episode's opening scene.The Baltimore Sun's Ethan Renner reviewed the episode positively, summarizing "This was another great outing, and I find myself looking forward to the next twists and turns in a way I haven't with Homeland for several years". Brian Tallerico of New York Magazine rated the episode 4 out of 5 stars, also praising Danes' performance, and crediting the episode for incorporating the series' history in many ways.

=== Ratings ===
The original broadcast was watched by 1.26 million viewers.
