= Tuesday Morning Quarterback =

Defunct column on American football by Gregg Easterbrook

"Tuesday Morning Quarterback" was a column written by Gregg Easterbrook that started in 2000 and published every football season until temporarily stopping publication for the 2016 season. The column moved to The Weekly Standard for the 2017 NFL season, debuting on August 22, 2017.

The column is noted for its length (it often runs over 15 pages in printed form) and frequent sidetracking into political and non-football-related discussion. Easterbrook commonly includes a "Running Items Department", football haiku and senryū, "Cheerbabe Cheesecake" and "Equal-Time Beefcake", "obscure college-football scores" including his obsession with Indiana of Pennsylvania and California of Pennsylvania, and continual references to Christmas creep and the general trend of pushing events earlier and earlier (which he refers to as the "Unified Field Theory of Creep").

The column derives its name from the phrase Monday morning quarterback, a derogatory term for a pundit (and the name of a competing long-read column by Peter King of Sports Illustrated). The change in day reflects its typical publishing date of Tuesday, which also allows the column to address that week's Monday Night Football contest. He also guarantees "All Predictions Wrong or Your Money Back." Since the column is free, there is nothing to be refunded.

On May 13, 2015, Easterbrook announced that ESPN had not renewed "TMQ".

Easterbrook joined The Upshot, the blog of The New York Times, for the 2015 NFL season. The column went on hiatus in 2016. For the 2017 season, Easterbrook's columns were published by The Weekly Standard, until Week 15, when the whole magazine folded. Beginning with the first week of the 2023 NFL season, "TMQ" has been published on Easterbrook's Substack, "All Predictions Wrong."

== Recurring themes ==
General themes which recur in the column include:

- An emphasis on solid football fundamentals, as opposed to what Easterbrook considers an overemphasis on flashy, but risky, and often foolish plays, designed to obtain greater media coverage.
- Bemoaning the tendency of teams to pass instead of run the football.
- Analysis of coaching strategy and various excellent or atrocious plays and games.
- Contending that most successful plays are usually the product of good offensive or defensive line play, rather than the prowess of any individual quarterback, running back or wide receiver.
- Criticizing the overuse of the blitz
- Commenting on coaches punting or kicking field goals instead of trying for first downs or touchdowns, which he mocks as "cowardly".
- Mockery of most coaches in general, except for Bill Belichick with whom he has a conflicted relationship, due to his brilliant coaching yet recent ethical lapses.
- Mockery of various publicity stunts and other public actions from individuals in the football world whom he considers foolish.
- A continuing tirade against the NFL Sunday Ticket product available only through DirecTV, which he considers an illegal monopoly and an example of a for-profit corporation taking advantage of municipal taxpayers, who fund NFL stadium construction.
- Advocates a "no punting" strategy on 4th down plays, as well as going for a two-point conversion when trailing by one in the final seconds of a game, citing the higher expected value of a successful conversion vs. turning the ball over to the opponent, and bemoaning coaches who do not take the risk. The crux of Easterbrook's argument is that the average yards gained on a play is 5 yards. Analysts, however, have stated this theory is short-sighted, since it does not take into account the fact that 4th-and-short attempts usually face goal-line defenses; as such, the two-point conversion, which takes place only two yards from the end zone, is more likely to fail than not, with a 40% success rate. Easterbrook disputes this analysis and claims that the real percentage is between 50% and 55%.
- Criticizing several local markets' tendency to air lackluster games as opposed to more competitive matchups, except when a local team is playing, which by NFL rules with the television contracts are required to be shown in their home market in their entirety.
- Criticizing teams that make uniform changes, having cited only four recent team uniform changes (New England, Philadelphia, San Diego, and St. Louis) as being an improvement. In particular, Easterbrook hates the monochrome look of several teams, leading to the cognomen for Atlanta, Denver, and Seattle, while having mixed opinions on teams wearing throwbacks, favoring the Chargers' 1960s look, Buffalo Bills O. J. Simpson-era uniforms, and the Redskins 70th Anniversary throwbacks but not caring much for throwbacks worn by the Eagles, Steelers, or the New York Jets decision to return to the Joe Namath-era uniforms full-time in 1998.
- Highlighting examples of running up the score at all levels of football and counterexamples of the same team losing, as an illustration of bad karma. (Easterbrook will occasionally and facetiously compare the two scores, add the margin of loss to the margin of victory, and extrapolate a transitive relation, suggesting that the team whom the runners lost to would have beaten the team the runners had won against by an even larger margin.) Easterbrook does not object to running up the score in the NFL, with the caveat that tragedy follows greed for those who do so.

Easterbrook also espouses certain football superstitions attributed to a "pantheon" of "football gods" who bestow victory upon the team with the least warmly dressed coach (Cold Coach = Victory), the most sportsmanlike conduct, the most spirited play, or the most scantily dressed cheerleaders (especially in cold weather); Easterbrook also highlights one particularly attractive cheerleader from an NFL team each week.

Also, the column is known for randomly placed items and rants on various topics on politics, science fiction, actual science, and various television, film, and pop culture items. Photographs and captions accompany the columns which are often designed to be ridiculously humorous metaphors or caricatures of various persons or items mentioned in the column.

== "TMQ" team nicknames ==
Easterbrook refers to teams by nicknames or "cognomen", such as "Potomac Drainage Basin Indigenous Persons" (Washington Redskins) and "Arizona CAUTION: MAY CONTAIN FOOTBALL-LIKE SUBSTANCE Cardinals" (Arizona Cardinals). The nicknames are usually used only if a team is struggling or if the team made a boneheaded play that cost them a game. One exception is the Redskins, whom Easterbrook criticized because of the team's Native American mascot. The nicknames also extends into college football, calling the Miami Hurricanes the "Miami Tropical Storms" having been downgraded from a hurricane to a tropical storm, likely in reference to the 2011 scandal.

Beginning with the 2014 season, Easterbrook largely abandoned cognomens for teams, preferring to call the teams by their actual names. Exceptions were made for the Redskins (whose nickname had got more mainstream controversy in recent years and was ultimately retired in 2020) and teams that play a considerable distance from their home city like the Giants, Jets, and 49ers. As of the 2017 season, Easterbrook still maintains an official list of cognomen.

Team	Nickname(s)	Explanation
Arizona Cardinals	Arizona of Mexico Cardinals	During the 2005 season Arizona played a "home" game in Mexico City, drawing far more spectators than the team typically managed to in Arizona.
Arizona Cardinals	Arizona Cactus Wrens	The cactus wren is the official state bird of Arizona.
Arizona Cardinals	Arizona (CAUTION: MAY CONTAIN FOOTBALL-LIKE SUBSTANCE) Cardinals	The franchise is a historically poor performer in the NFL.
Arizona Cardinals	Arizona (Contains Powerful Football Substance) Cardinals	Arizona's 2008–2009 playoff run prompted a deserved name change.
Atlanta Falcons	Atlanta Typos	The Atlanta uniforms resemble errant smudges on a printing run.
Atlanta Falcons	Epic Fails	So named for their improbable collapse versus the New England Patriots in Super Bowl LI, losing 28-34 after holding a 28-3 lead in the third quarter.
Atlanta Falcons	The Angry Birds	In reference to the popular video game of the same name, the nickname was given in 2011 after the Falcons had the NFC's best record in 2010 only to be blown out in their only playoff game that year by the eventual Super Bowl champion Green Bay Packers, hinting that the Falcons are "angry". No mention of the Typos nickname in the post, combined that the all-black uniforms were replaced by the team's 1966 throwback uniform as the team's third uniform in 2009, hinting that the Typos name may have been retired.
Baltimore Ravens	The Nevermores	Edgar Allan Poe was a famous resident of Baltimore and his poem "The Raven" was the inspiration for the team's name. The poem is well known for its repeated use of the word "nevermore".
Buffalo Bills	Buffalo	Around 2008 he used the nickname "Budgies" for the team; during this time, he often used a mock Boston Brahmin affection when writing about the team due to the presence of Ivy Leaguers Dick Jauron and Ryan Fitzpatrick. Years later, he switched to the name "Williams;" "Bill" is short for "William," and the team at the time had several players surnamed Williams on the roster. Easterbrook, a Buffalo native, has since retired the Bills nicknames, explaining that he does not call the team "Orchard Park" because the team's stadium is in the same county as Buffalo.
Chicago Bears	Ming Ding Xiong	Mandarin for "bears whose outcomes are decided by fate". Their recent successful seasons had several games won on "lucky" plays, or decided by fate.
Cincinnati Bengals	Cincinnati Tootsie-Rolls	The black and orange uniforms resemble a Tootsie Roll wrapper.
Cincinnati Bengals	Cincinnati Trick or Treats	Black and orange are typically the dominant colors of Halloween decor.
Cleveland Browns	Cleveland Browns (Release 3.0b)	Originally nicknamed "Release 2.0" when Cleveland first regained its NFL franchise, the version number was incremented when Romeo Crennel became head coach.
Cleveland Browns	(also Cleveland Oranges, Release 3.0b)	The Browns also wore all-orange uniforms from time to time, leading to the Oranges nickname, but no longer wear the orange jerseys. The name is also a dig to the fairly drastic reorganizations and retooling of the Cleveland roster over recent years.
Detroit Lions	Detroit Peugeots	The lion logo resembles the logo of the Peugeot Motor Company, which is ironic because the team is owned by the Ford family.
Detroit Lions	The Cowardly Lions	A reference to their tendency to punt on fourth downs as opposed to trying to achieve a first down, a move which Easterbrook detests.
Detroit Lions	Detroit Edsels	Referring to Ford's infamous late-1950s automotive flop; an obvious jab at both the Lions' long history of futility and the Ford family ownership.
Denver Broncos	Denver Cursors	The Broncos' uniform contains a bright orange stripe, described as a cursor when viewed on TV.
Denver Broncos	Denver Broncos High School	Used late in the 2011 season to refer to the offense installed by John Fox to accommodate Tim Tebow, a run-oriented read-option scheme that at the time was widely popular in American high schools.
Houston Texans	The Moo Cows	The team's logo is essentially a stylized cow.
Indianapolis Colts	The Lucky Charms	The horseshoe logo resembles a marshmallow shape from Lucky Charms cereal.
Kansas City Chiefs	The Flintstones	The stone arrowhead logo resembles carved, stone age items seen in the cartoon.
Las Vegas Raiders	Oakland Long Johns	After the pirate of that name. Used while the team was in Oakland.
Las Vegas Raiders	Las Vegas Sinners	A reference to the city's reputation as "Sin City" and the Raiders' history of dirty play.
Los Angeles Chargers	Bolts	The Chargers' logo resembles a bolt of lightning.
Los Angeles Chargers	LA/B	The Chargers moved to Los Angeles before the 2017 season. As the second team to move to Los Angeles, the team is designated "B".
Los Angeles Rams	Les Mouflons	A mouflon is a type of sheep whose curved horns are often mistakenly used as a depiction of ram horns. Dubbed after a series of what Easterbrook considered poorly played games by the team in their days in St. Louis. Retired after the team's move to Los Angeles.
Los Angeles Rams	LA/A	The Rams moved to Los Angeles prior to the 2016 season; as the first team to move to Los Angeles, they are designated as the "A" team.
Miami Dolphins	Marine Mammals	Though the Dolphins are often referred to as "the fish", dolphins are actually mammals.
Miami Dolphins	The South Florida Dolphins	The Dolphins currently do not play in Miami proper. They play in Sun Life Stadium in Miami Gardens, 15 miles north of downtown.
Miami Dolphins	Genetically Engineered Surimi	Introduced by Easterbrook in an April 23, 2013 column in which he mocked the team's recent logo change, saying "The Dolphins' new helmet emblem looks like the logo for a brand of genetically engineered surimi." Easterbrook also uses "Frozen Surimi".
Minnesota Vikings	Hyperboreans	The Hyperboreans were a mythical barbaric people in Greek mythology. Today the term can be used for any people who live in a cold climate, as the Vikings did.
New England Patriots	Flying Elvii	The team logo resembles an airborne Elvis Presley, and Easterbrook reasons that Elvii is the plural of Elvis. The team itself has admitted that the logo is modeled after Presley.
New Orleans Saints	The Sinners	In 2012, it was revealed that the Saints were involved in a very "unsaintly" bounty scandal.
New Orleans Saints	United States Saints	Following Hurricane Katrina the Saints were without a home field for an entire season, and were adopted by the rest of the country.
New Orleans Saints	The Boy Scouts	The fleur-de-lis logo used by the Saints is similar to the logo of the Boy Scouts of America.
New York Giants	Jersey/A	The Giants actually play in New Jersey. MetLife Stadium (originally New Meadowlands Stadium) is located in East Rutherford, New Jersey, next to the team's now-demolished former venue, Giants Stadium. The "A" likely refers to the fact that the Giants were the first of the two New York teams to move to New Jersey (in 1976, as opposed to the Jets, who did not move until 1984) and also were sole owners of Giants Stadium, with the Jets as their tenants (both teams jointly own the new stadium). As for the stadium, Easterbrook began calling it "Snoopy Stadium" in his October 12, 2011 column, referring to the character's use as MetLife's advertising mascot.
New York Giants	The G-Persons	The Giants are commonly referred to as the G-Men. Because some of the people in the Giants organization are women as well, G-Persons is more politically correct.
New York Jets	Jersey/B	The Jets play in New Jersey as well; as noted above, they were tenants of the Giants from 1984 through 2009, before the opening of MetLife Stadium. When the Jets played at home in Giants Stadium, announcers referred to the venue as The Meadowlands, in reference to the Meadowlands sports complex in which the stadium is located.
Philadelphia Eagles	The Nesharim	Philadelphia has the sole logo that faces right to left and "nesharim" means "eagles" in Hebrew, which is also read right to left.
Philadelphia Eagles	The Heat	Easterbrook decided to give the Nesharim nickname a break for 2011 after the team signed several Pro Bowl-caliber players after the end of the 2011 NFL lockout. The name is in reference to the Miami Heat of the NBA, which the previous year made its own rash of free agent signings. Easterbrook returned to "Nesharim" after LeBron James left the Heat to return to Cleveland in 2014.
Pittsburgh Steelers	The Hypocycloids	The team logo features three hypocycloids.
San Francisco 49ers	Squared Sevens	Seven is the square root of 49. From the 2011–2012 season Coach Jim Harbaugh also gained a nickname as Harbaugh/West in reference to his brother (mentioned as Harbaugh-East in the August 23 column) coaching the Baltimore Ravens.
San Francisco 49ers	Santa Clara	In 2014, the 49ers moved from San Francisco to Levi's Stadium in Santa Clara.
Seattle Seahawks	Blue-ish Men Group (formerly Blue Men Group)	The Seahawks wear entirely blue uniforms. By contrast, most teams wear uniforms whose pants and jerseys are different colors. The name is a reference to the Blue Man Group, whose performers wear black clothes but cover all exposed skin with blue. In response to the radical overhaul of the Seahawks uniform by Nike in 2012, Easterbrook added the suffix "ish" to the nickname to describe their new color scheme.
Seattle Seahawks	Green Men Group	The alternate nickname always appears when they wear their green alternate uniform, though the nickname has made several appearances in the 2009 season even when they wear other uniforms.
Tampa Bay Buccaneers	City of Tampa Buccaneers	The team actually plays in the City of Tampa, Tampa Bay being a body of water.
Tennessee Titans	Flaming Thumbtacks	The team logo bears an uncanny resemblance to a thumbtack with a flame on the top. This nickname was first used by a reader of the original TMQ column with the username of Rib Eye.
Washington Redskins	Potomac Drainage Basin Indigenous Persons	The Redskins are headquartered in Ashburn, Virginia and play at FedExField in Landover, Maryland, but have no facilities in the nation's capital itself. Indigenous Persons, now occasionally shortened to just "Persons", was used to avoid the more controversial Redskins. Easterbrook's original nickname made reference to the Chesapeake Bay, but later changed to the more accurate Potomac River since the Chesapeake Bay area also covered the Baltimore Ravens, with its watershed going all the way up to Pennsylvania state.
Washington Redskins	(also Washington Nanticokes)	The Nanticoke are the tribe indigenous to the area. Easterbrook briefly switched back to calling the team the Washington Redskins out of respect for Joe Gibbs when he initially came back, but after the poorly-played 2004 season, he switched back to the other names.
Washington Redskins	Redskins	Easterbrook began using this term in the 2013 season alongside "Indigenous Persons", when media focus on the team name escalated.

Easterbrook also frequently referred to defensive coordinator Gregg Williams as being "tastefully named", due to the two sharing the first name of Gregg. He has used the nickname throughout Williams' various coaching stops in Buffalo, Washington, New Orleans and St. Louis, but apparently stopped it once Williams' role in the New Orleans Saints bounty scandal was revealed and he was banned indefinitely from the league.

== Tuesday Morning Quarterback Non-QB Non-RB NFL MVP award ==
According to Easterbrook, the "longest [named] award in sports". This is the top award in a series of awards he publishes at the end of each season, known as the "All-Unwanted All-Pros." These awards were created due to Easterbrook's view that the awards and Pro Bowl selection of various sports media outlets and the NFL tended to unfairly reward what he considered "glory boy" positions, such as quarterbacks, running backs, and wide receivers, as well as players who tended to be better known due to higher press coverage as opposed to actual quality of play. (New England Patriots wideout Troy Brown, who won the award in 2004 despite primarily being a wide receiver, was considered an exception since he also played cornerback that season after the Patriots had a rash of injuries at the position during the season.) Easterbrook also was protesting the lack of attention given to offensive or defensive linemen whom he considers the most important positions in football. Criteria tend to vary from year to year but generally includes players who either were undrafted or cut from previous teams, but otherwise managed to play important or pivotal roles with their current teams over the course of the season. Originally, they also had to be on a playoff team even to be considered; starting in 2013, Easterbrook restricted eligibility even further, only allowing players on Super Bowl teams to be considered. The 2013 award, given to Seattle Seahawks cornerback Richard Sherman, was the first to be determined by online voting from TMQ readers. Most of the winners through the 2011 season were offensive linemen, but the five winners from 2012-2017 were defensive players. The two winners from the Kansas City Chiefs in 2023-24 were ranked as the top two in both years, and the award was alternated between them.

Year	Winner	Team	Position
2001	Alan Faneca	Pittsburgh Steelers	Guard
2002	Lincoln Kennedy	Oakland Raiders	Offensive tackle
2003	Damien Woody	New England Patriots	Guard
2004	Troy Brown	New England Patriots	Wide receiver/cornerback
2005	Walter Jones	Seattle Seahawks	Offensive tackle
2006	Jeff Saturday	Indianapolis Colts	Center
2007	Matt Light	New England Patriots	Offensive tackle
2008	James Harrison	Pittsburgh Steelers	Linebacker
2009	Dallas Clark	Indianapolis Colts	Tight end
2010	Dan Koppen	New England Patriots	Center
2011	David Diehl	New York Giants	Offensive tackle
2012	NaVorro Bowman	San Francisco 49ers	Linebacker
2013	Richard Sherman	Seattle Seahawks	Cornerback
2014	Bobby Wagner	Seattle Seahawks	Linebacker
2015	Von Miller	Denver Broncos	Linebacker
2017	Fletcher Cox	Philadelphia Eagles	Defensive tackle
2023	Creed Humphrey	Kansas City Chiefs	Center
2024	Chris Jones	Kansas City Chiefs	Defensive tackle

== Kill Bill controversy ==
ESPN fired Easterbrook after he made comments about Jewish Hollywood executives and the film Kill Bill on a blog hosted by The New Republic. Easterbrook apologized for his comments and resumed his "Tuesday Morning Quarterback" column, temporarily for two weeks on the independent website Football Outsiders, and then more permanently for NFL.com. During his stint on NFL.com, Easterbrook was also an analyst for the then-fledgling NFL Network. On April 24, 2006, it was announced that Easterbrook would be brought back to ESPN's website after a two-year absence. His return column, a preview of the 2006 NFL draft, appeared the following day.

== Spygate ==
Easterbook's column has been highly critical of Bill Belichick with relation to the "Spygate" controversy, calling for Belichick's suspension from the league. Easterbrook's most controversial article was "Suspending Belichick will bring closure to Spygate". Easterbrook's imaginative proposals led one reader to mockingly call him "Mr. Fantasy."

Easterbrook's response to Spygate was criticized by his fellow "Page Two" columnist (and self-professed Patriots fan) Bill Simmons. "If you have a national column in which you're excoriating a sports team for cheating even though it already paid a severe penalty for what it did, and you're hinting more revelations are coming down the road, and then it's proven you were barking up the wrong tree ... you need to admit defeat and quit blowing the situation out of proportion. No, really." After the Rams and Patriots again reached the Super Bowl in 2019, Easterbrook tweeted the accusation that Belichick videotaped the Rams' walkthrough the first time around.
