= Beside Still Waters (book) =

1998 book by Gregg Easterbrook

- Cover artist: Book design by Bernard Klein
- Language: English
- Subject: Modern religion and analysis of the Bible
- Genre: Religion
- Publisher: William Morrow and Company
- Publication date: 1998
- Publication place: United States
- Media type: Hardcover
- Pages: 381
- ISBN: 0-688-16065-4
- OCLC: 38925015
- Dewey Decimal: 220.6 21
- LC Class: BS533 .E37 1998

Beside Still Waters: Searching for Meaning in an Age of Doubt is a nonfiction book by Gregg Easterbrook. In it he defends religion against its critics. He expounds a theory of religion and Christianity based on his reading of the Old and New Testaments, in which God is not an omnipotent omniscient being, but rather a limited and perhaps awesomely powerful being who learns and grows over time. In this way, Easterbrook seeks to explain the ravages and evil of the Old Testament God and to bring back Jesus's original teachings of charity and of love for God and for fellow humans.

The title of the book comes from Psalm 23, which begins with "The Lord is my shepherd" and includes the line, "He leads me beside still waters."

== See also ==
- Open theism
- Process theology
