= Erin Darke =

American actress (born 1984)

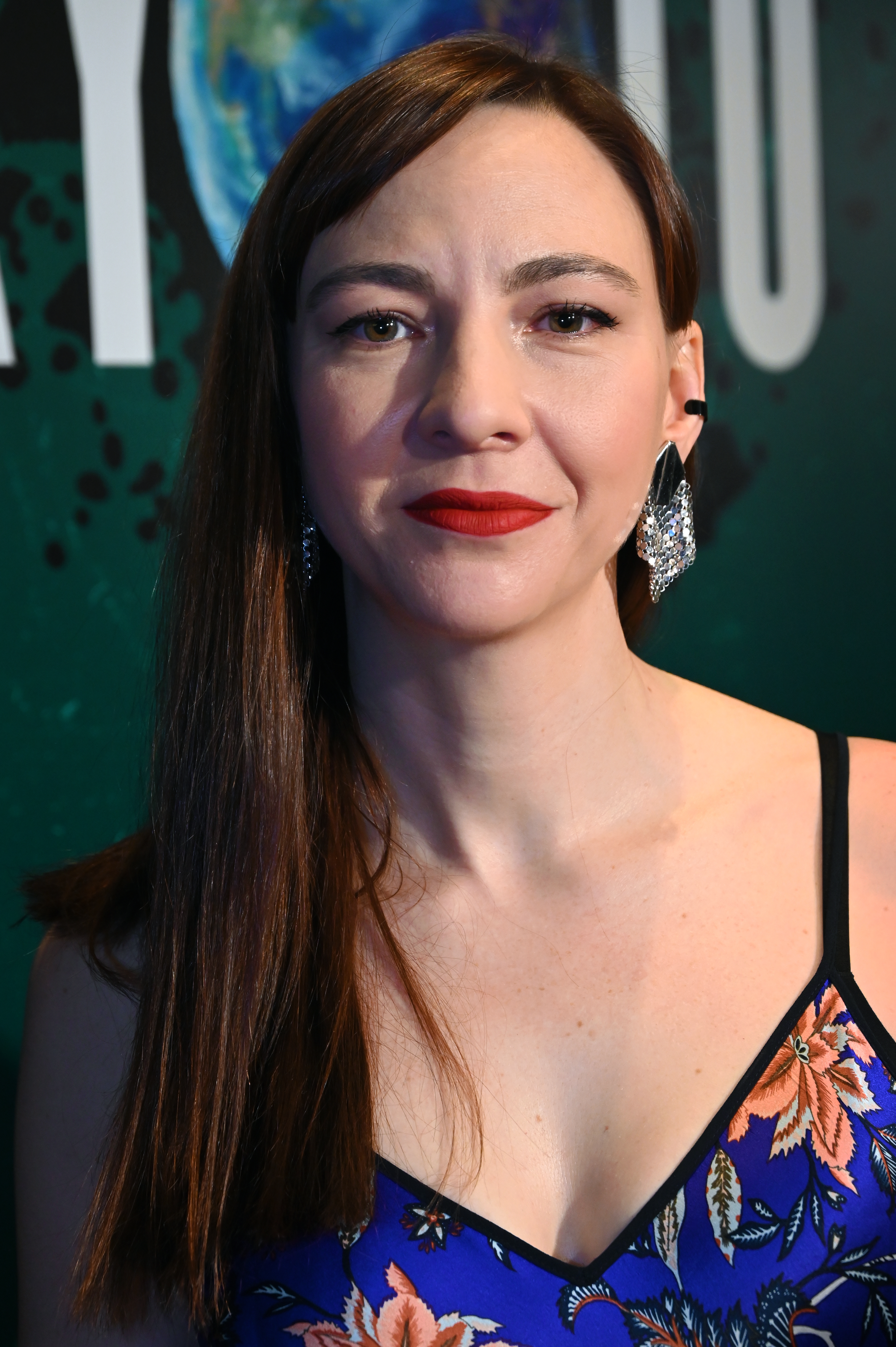
- Darke in 2025
- Born: Erin Constance-Maja Darke; September 10, 1984 (age 42); Flint, Michigan, U.S.
- Education: University of Michigan–Flint
- Occupation: Actress
- Years active: 2009–present
- Partner: Daniel Radcliffe (2012–present)
- Children: 1

Erin Constance-Maja Darke (born September 10, 1984) is an American actress. She is known for her role as Cindy Reston in the TV series Good Girls Revolt. She also played Mary in The Marvelous Mrs. Maisel and Leeta in the AMC series Dietland. She has appeared in the films Love & Mercy (2014), Beside Still Waters (2014), Still Alice (2014), and Don't Think Twice (2016).

== Early life ==
Erin Constance-Maja Darke was born September 10, 1984, in Flint, Michigan.

At the age of 16, Darke enrolled in the University of Michigan-Flint, where in 2005 she earned a bachelor's degree of fine arts in theater performance."

== Career ==
Shortly after graduating, Darke moved to New York City and starred in several plays before getting a job at a casting office. This was her full time job until she decided that "my heart was still in acting" and went on to star in Obelisk Road, a 2009 short film, and procured minor roles in the 2011 films We Need to Talk About Kevin and Young Adult, as well as 2012's Disconnect. Darke played a small role in the 2013 thriller Kill Your Darlings, opposite Daniel Radcliffe. The same year, she played a lead role in Beside Still Waters. In 2014, Darke acted in Still Alice and Hunter&Game, along with several other films.

In 2015, she landed a lead role as Cindy Reston, one of several young female news reporters who sue their male bosses for their sexist and misogynistic behavior in the television series Good Girls Revolt. Bethonie Butler of The Washington Post praised Darke's performance for making "a lasting impression", while Pop Culture Nerd called her "endearing." Overall, the show received mixed reviews and was canceled after a single season. She then starred in the 2016 film Delinquent. In 2017, Darke played Mary in The Marvelous Mrs. Maisel, and had a role in the 2018 TV series Dietland. Along with Radcliffe, Darke starred in Miracle Workers in 2019. In 2023, Darke played an AI in Molli and Max in the Future. Mashable praised her performance as "terrifically on-point."

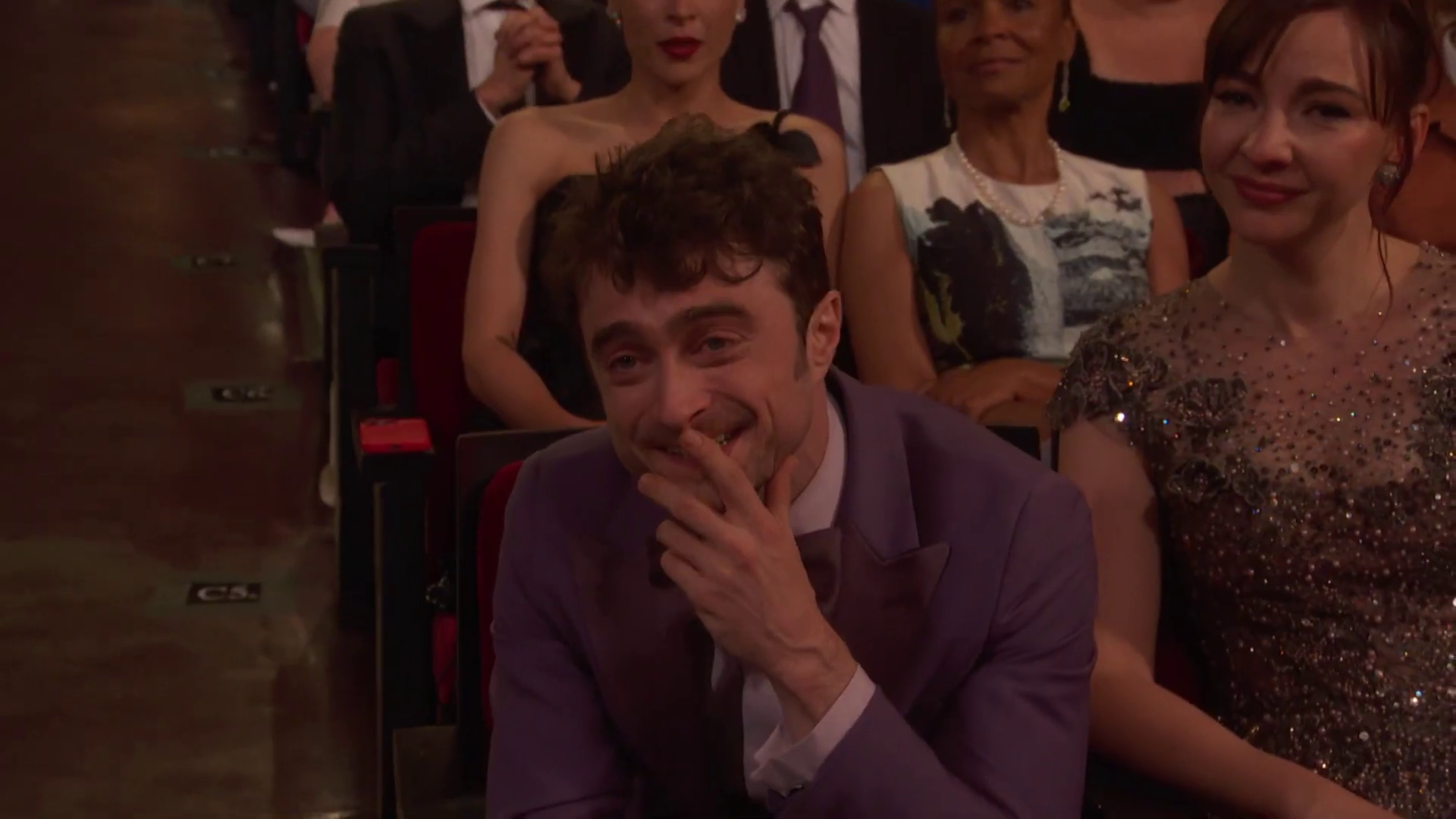
Darke and Daniel Radcliffe at the 2024 Tony Awards

== Personal life ==
Darke has been in a relationship with Daniel Radcliffe since 2012, having met on the set of the film Kill Your Darlings. They have a son, who was born in April 2023.

== Filmography ==
=== Film ===
Film work by Erin Darke
Year	Title	Role	Notes
2011	We Need to Talk About Kevin	Young Assistant Rose	
2011	Young Adult	Teen Employee	
2012	2 Days in New York	Cynthia	
2012	Disconnect	Lauren	Uncredited
2013	Kill Your Darlings	Gwendolyn	
2013	Beside Still Waters	Abby	
2014	Draft Day	Seahawks Fan	
2014	The Longest Week	Bartender	
2014	The Drop	Cocktail Waitress	
2014	Love & Mercy	Marilyn Wilson	
2014	Still Alice	Jenny	
2014	The Quitter	Chloe	
2014	Hunter&Game	Audrey	
2014	Seven Lovers	Laura	
2015	Sidewalk Traffic	Dalia	
2016	Complete Unknown	Holly	
2016	Don't Think Twice	Natasha	
2016	Delinquent	Tara	
2017	The Sounding	Christine	
2017	Thank You for Your Service	Tracey	
2018	Night Comes On	Rita Smith	
2018	Summer '03	Hope	
2023	Molli and Max in the Future	MAR14	

=== Television ===
Television work by Erin Darke
Year	Title	Role	Notes
2009	Mercy	Anne	Episode: "I'm Not That Kind of Girl"
2011	Pan Am	Mimi Narducci	Episode: "Pilot"
2014	Girls	Stacey	Episode: "Dead Inside"
2014	Black Box	Claire Tymoschuk	Episode: "Who Are You?"
2014	Irreversible	Ellie	Television film
2015	Forever	Liz Chamberlin	Episode: "Social Engineering"
2015	Battle Creek	Annie	Episode: "Stockholm"
2015	Public Morals	Suzie	Episode: "Family Is Family"
2015–2016	Good Girls Revolt	Cindy Reston	10 episodes
2017	Homeland	Nicki	Episode: "The Flag House"
2017–2018	The Marvelous Mrs. Maisel	Mary	4 episodes
2018	Dietland	Leeta Albridge	10 episodes
2019	The Loudest Voice	Kat Lindsley	Episode: "2012"
2019	FBI	Laura Russo	Episode: "Crossroads"
2021-2023	Moonshine	Crystal Leblanc	21 episodes
2021-2023	Miracle Workers	Phaedra	7 episodes
