= Beside Still Waters (film) =

- Film poster
- Directed by: Chris Lowell
- Written by: Chris Lowell; Mohit Narang
- Produced by: Chris Lowell, Steven Gorel, Jason Potash, Paul Finkle
- Starring: Ryan Eggold; Beck Bennett; Will Brill; Brett Dalton; Erin Darke; Jessy Hodges; Britt Lower; Reid Scott
- Cinematography: Timothy Naylor
- Edited by: Nick Houy
- Production company: Storyboard Entertainment
- Release dates: October 12, 2013 (MVFF); November 14, 2014 (United States)
- Running time: 76 minutes
- Country: United States
- Language: English
- Budget: $207,061

Beside Still Waters is an American comedy-drama film co-written, produced, and directed by actor Chris Lowell in his directorial debut. The film was released on November 14, 2014.

== Premise ==
In the wake of his parents' deaths and about to sell their summer home, Daniel has one final weekend with his friends, reality TV star James, recently unemployed Tom, Martin and his wife Abby, Charley, and Daniel's ex-girlfriend Olivia and her fiancé Henry.

== Cast ==
- Ryan Eggold as Daniel
- Britt Lower as Olivia
- Brett Dalton as James
- Reid Scott as Henry
- Beck Bennett as Tom
- Will Brill as Martin
- Jessy Hodges as Charley
- Erin Darke as Abby

== Production ==
The film was shot in Petoskey, Michigan.

== Release ==
Beside Still Waters had its world premiere at the 36th Mill Valley Film Festival on October 12, 2013. The film screened at the Austin Film Festival on October 26, 2013 (where it won the Jury Prize and the Audience Award), and the Atlanta Film Festival on March 29, 2014. It opened the Sonoma Film Festival on April 2, 2014. On August 20, 2014, it was announced that Tribeca Film bought the film and had set a limited theatrical release date for November 14, 2014, and a VOD release date of November 18, 2014.
