= C. J. Wilson (actor) =

American film and theater actor

C.J. Wilson
- Born: Charles Joseph Wilson; April 24, 1970 (age 56); Fairhope, Alabama, U.S.
- Occupation: Actor
- Years active: 1998–present

Charles Joseph Wilson is an American film and theater actor. In 2010, he received a Lucille Lortel Award nomination for his role as Michael in Lucinda Coxon's play Happy Now?. He was nominated again in 2016 for Outstanding Featured Actor in a Play for his role in Hold On to Me Darling.

== Early life and education ==
Born on April 24, 1970 and raised in Fairhope, Alabama, Wilson became interested in acting while studying at Troy State University. He also attended the Juilliard School.

== Career ==
He made his Broadway debut in the 2000 revival of Gore Vidal's The Best Man. Other Broadway credits include A Steady Rain, Festen, Henry IV, and Long Day's Journey into Night. Off-Broadway, he appeared in All-American at LCT 3; The Bear at HERE; Offices and The Voysey Inheritance at Atlantic Theater; Race at Jewish Rep; Stop Kiss, The Cripple of Inishmaan and The Merry Wives of Windsor at the Public Theater. He also appeared in nine episodes of the sixth season of the American television drama series Homeland.

== Filmography ==
=== Film ===
Year	Title	Role	Notes
2001	Campfire Stories	Deputy Horace Pell	
2009	My Secret Billionaire	Steve	
2012	The Magic of Belle Isle	Fire Captain	
2015	Demolition	Carl	
2015	The Intern	Mike	
2016	Manchester by the Sea	George	
2017	Easy Living	Fred	
2018	A Vigilante	Michael Shaund	
2020	Irresistible	Dave Vanelton	
2020	The Trial of the Chicago 7	Sergeant Scott Scibelli	
2022	Hungry Dog Blues	Terrence Whithers	
2024	Drive-Away Dolls	Flint	
2026	Rain Reign	TBA	

=== Television ===
Year	Title	Role	Notes
1998	One Life to Live	Dr. Lange	Episode #1.7659
2001	Deadline	Dr. Steven Golding	Episode: "The Old Ball Game"
2001–2008	Law & Order	Levi Ingle / Dr. Ed Daniels	3 episodes
2002	Ed	Fitzy	Episode: "The Shot"
2002	Law & Order: Special Victims Unit	Scott Lucas	Episode: "Competence"
2003	Third Watch	Jack Ramsey	Episode: "The Price of Nobility"
2005	Without a Trace	Todd Carson	Episode: "Safe"
2006	Brotherhood	Slow Charlie	Episode: "Genesis 27:29"
2006	Law & Order: Criminal Intent	Jeff	Episode: "Country Crossover"
2008	New Amsterdam	Walt Whitman	Episode: "Soldier's Heart"
2009	All My Children	Sheriff	Episode #1.10062
2011	Pan Am	Howard	2 episodes
2012	Blue Bloods	Bruce Richmond	Episode: "The Job"
2012	Ghoul	Randy Graco	Television film
2013	The Good Wife	Brian Eisenstadt	Episode: "A Precious Commodity"
2013	The Sound of Music Live!	Herr Zeller	Television special
2013–2014	The Americans	Agent Samuels	3 episodes
2014	The Following	Reverend Glenn	2 episodes
2016	House of Cards	Agent Lasker	2 episodes
2016	Netflix Presents: The Characters	Motorcycle Man / Host	2 episodes
2017	Colony	Agent Young	Episode: "Company Man"
2017	Homeland	Porteous Belli	9 episodes
2017	The Sinner	William	7 episodes
2018	Bull	Dr. Donovan Benanti	Episode: "Grey Areas"
2018	The Looming Tower	John Miller	Episode: "Now it Begins..."
2018	Elementary	Prashant Hobbs	Episode: "You've Come a Long Way, Baby"
2018	Quantico	Garrett King	2 episodes
2018	Mommy Blogger	Zack	2 episodes
2019–2021	The Blacklist	Young Dominic Wilkinson	3 episodes

=== Podcasts ===
Year	Title	Role	Notes
2019–2020	The Two Princes	Brutus	7 episodes
